= Ho Chi Minh City =

Largest city in Vietnam

Ho Chi Minh City Thành phố Hồ Chí Minh Saigon (Sài Gòn)
- Centrally-governed city (special)
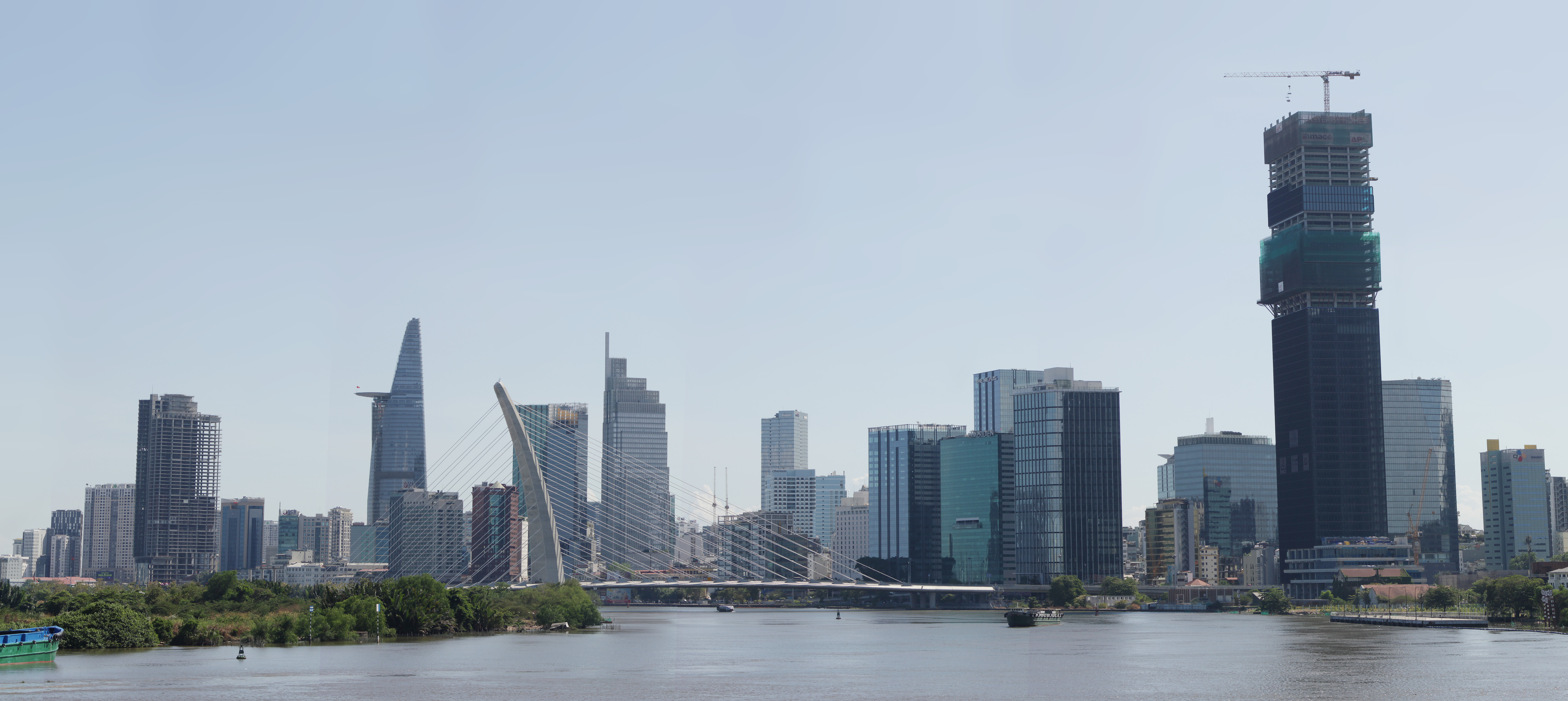
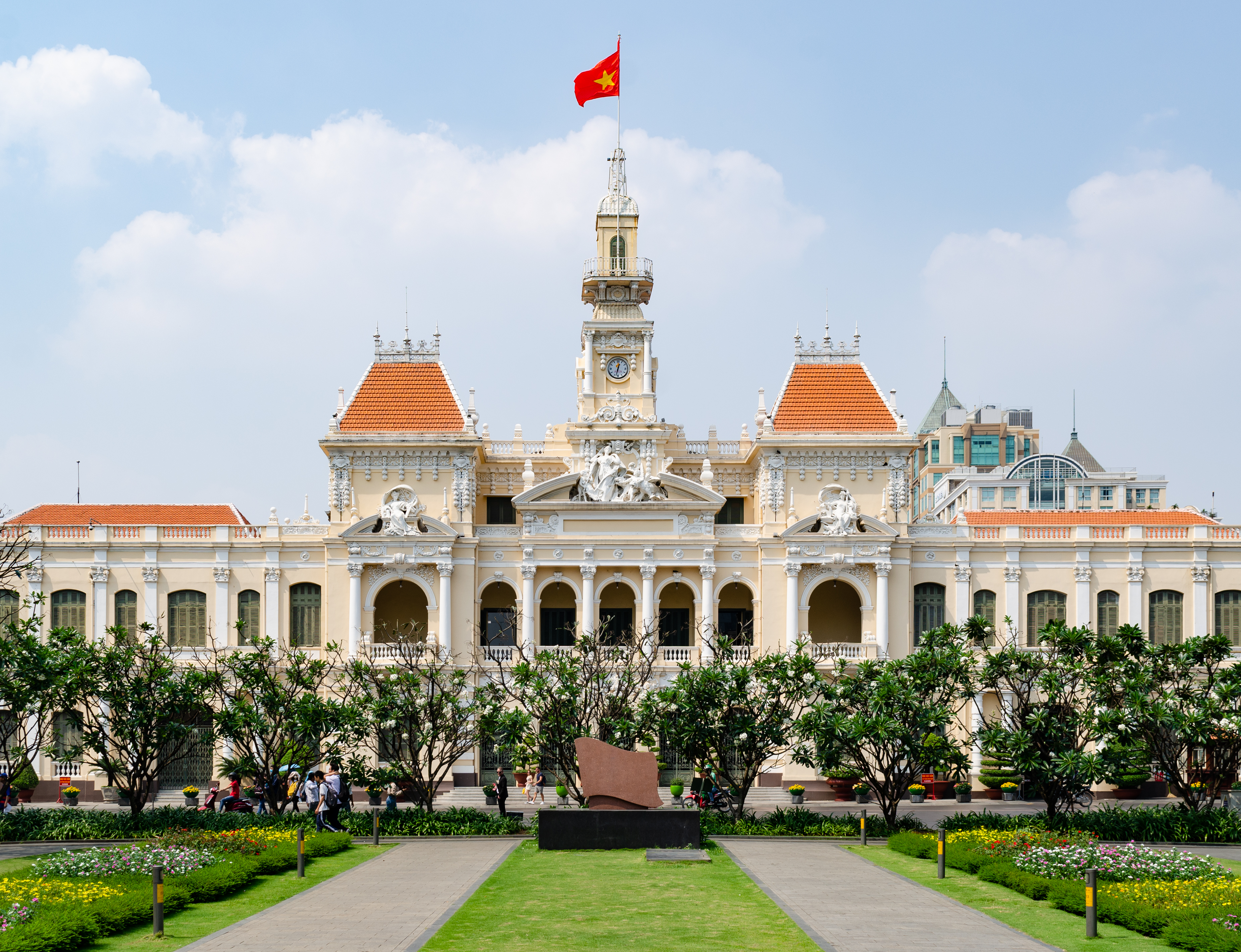
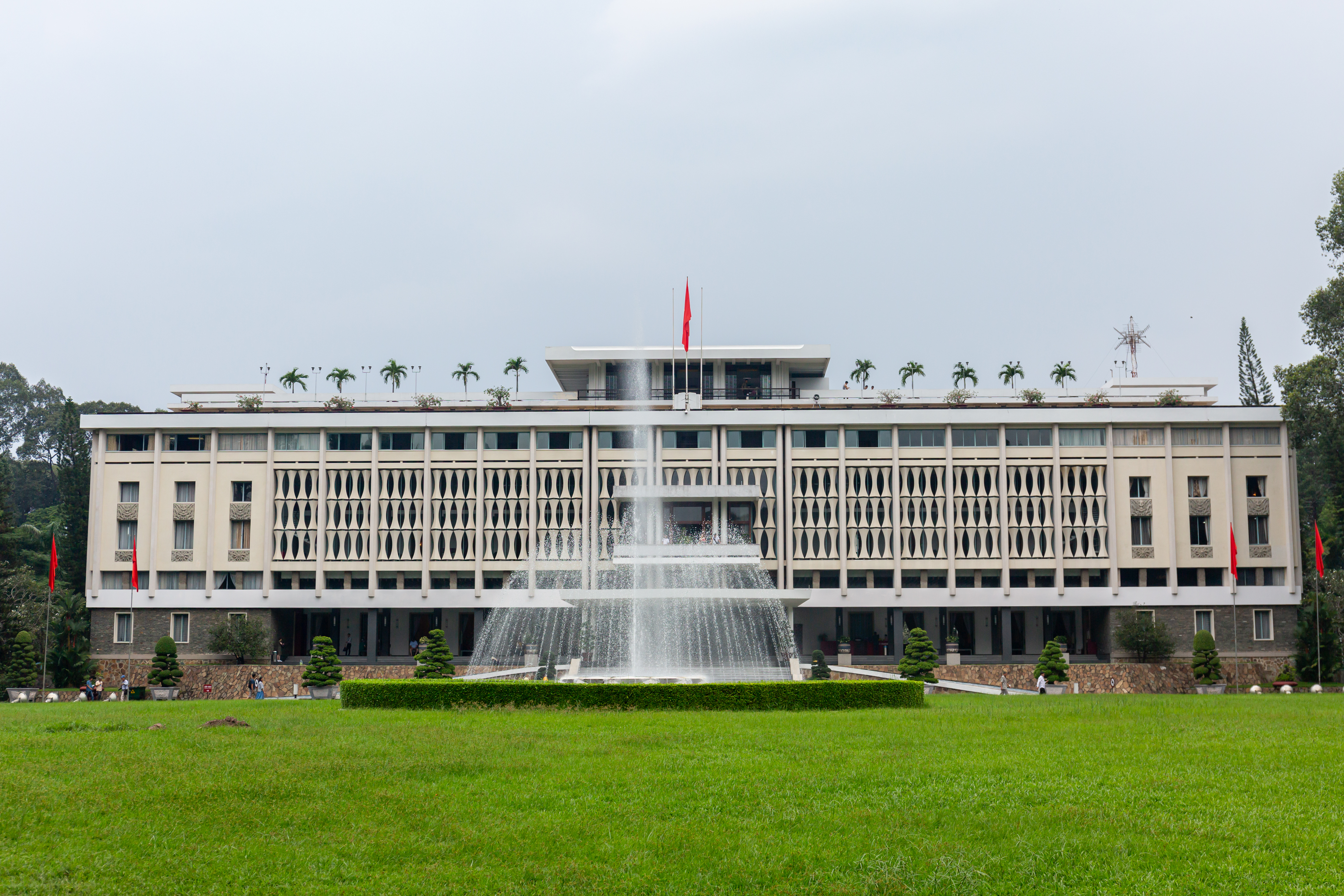
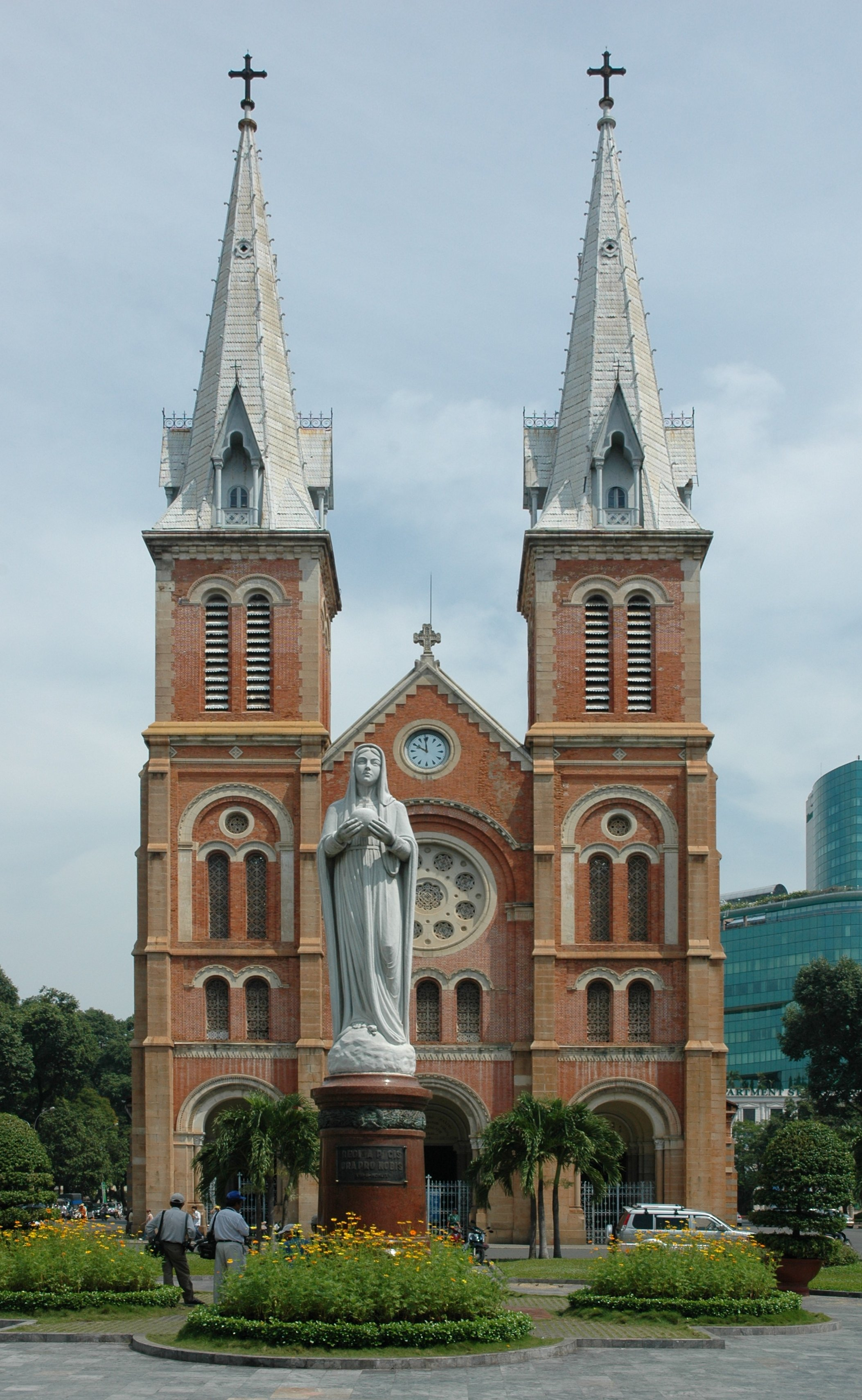
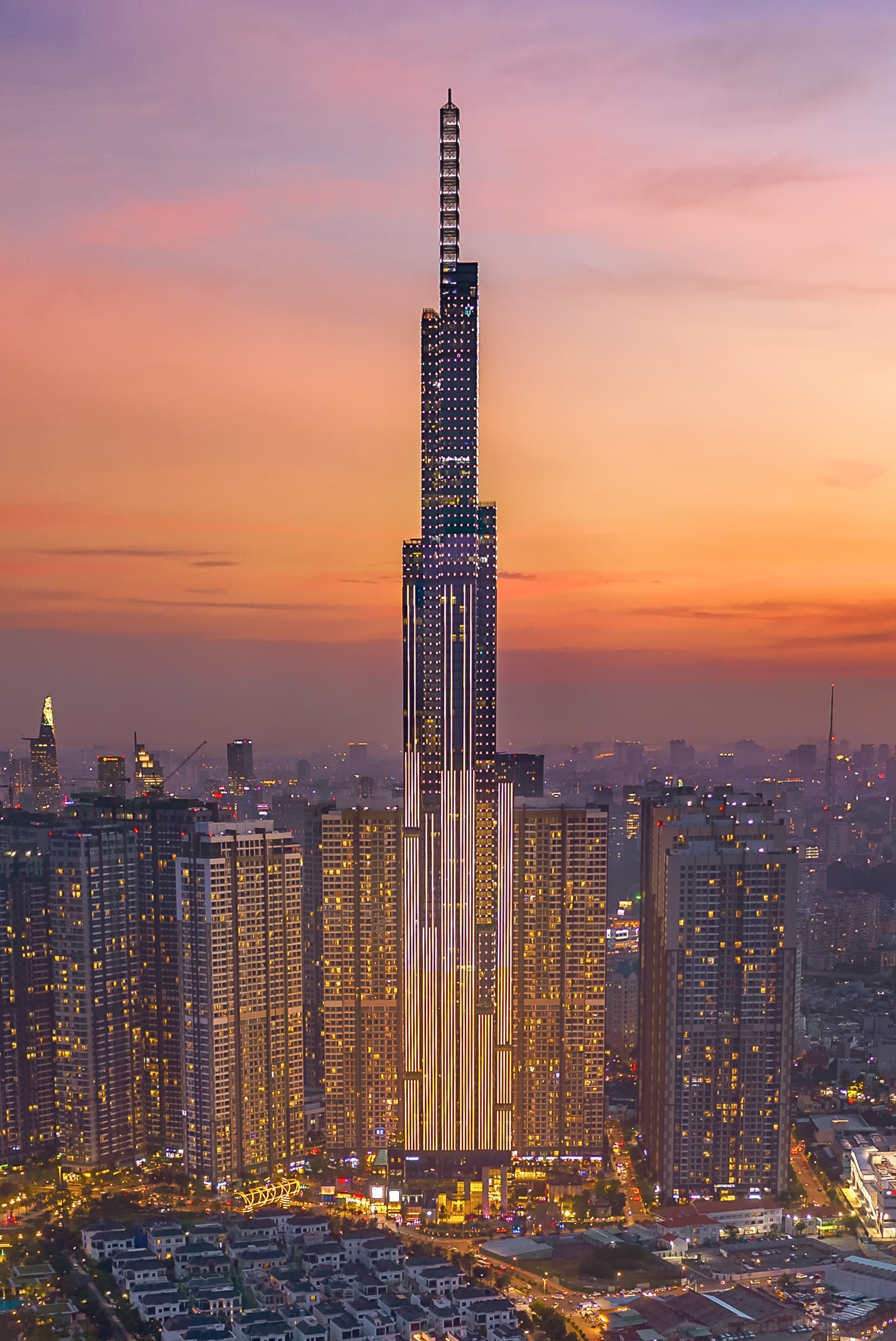
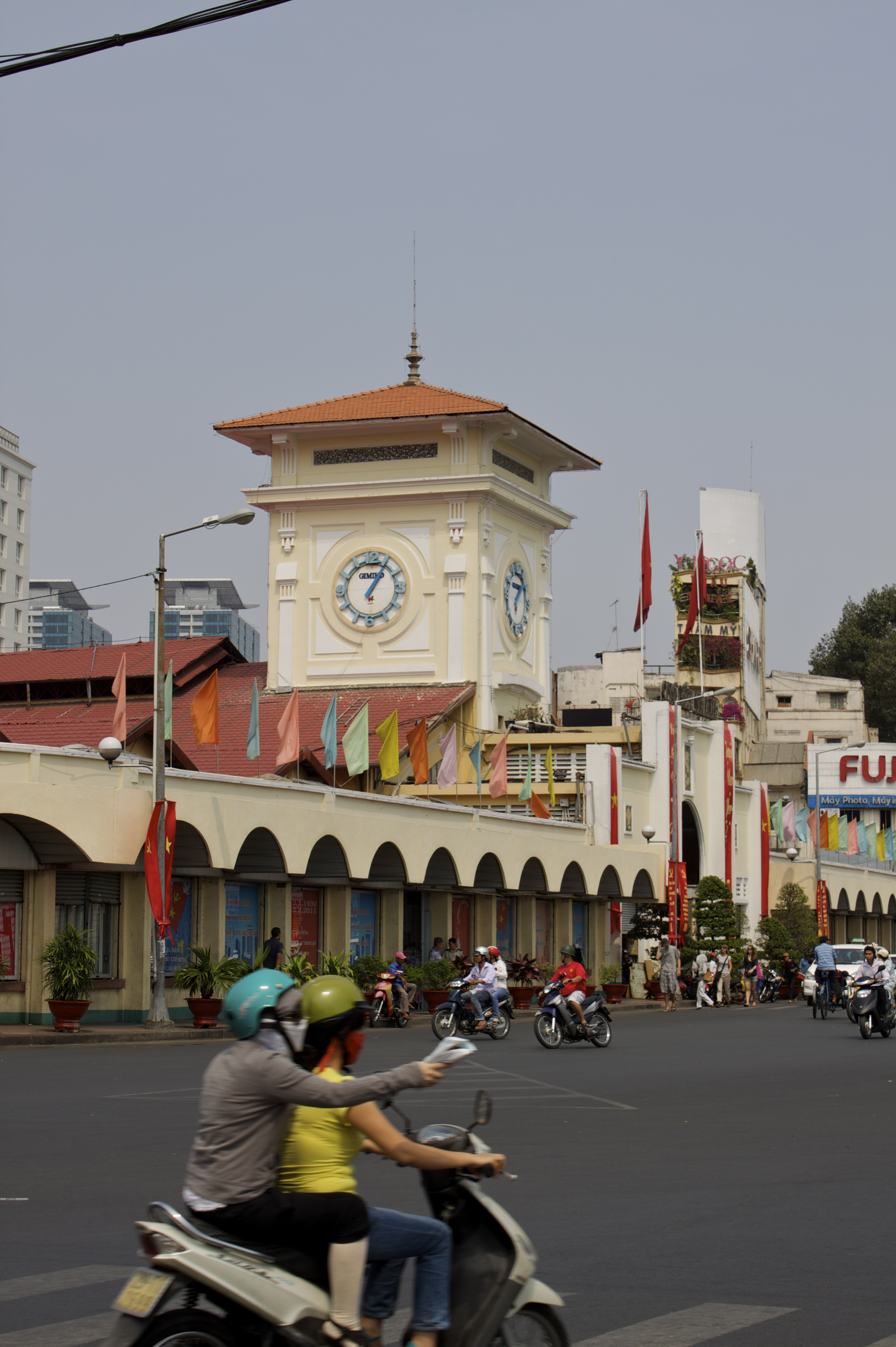
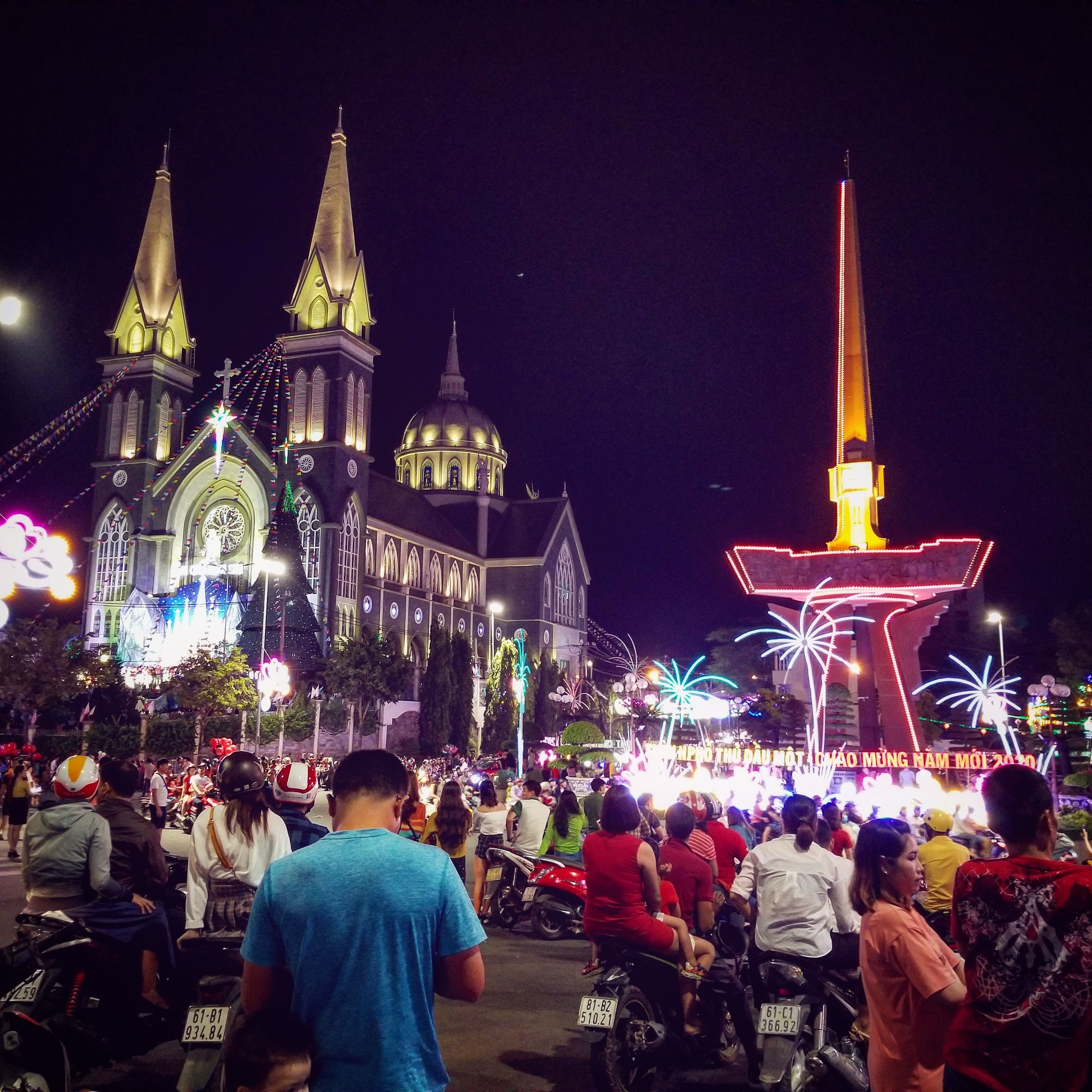
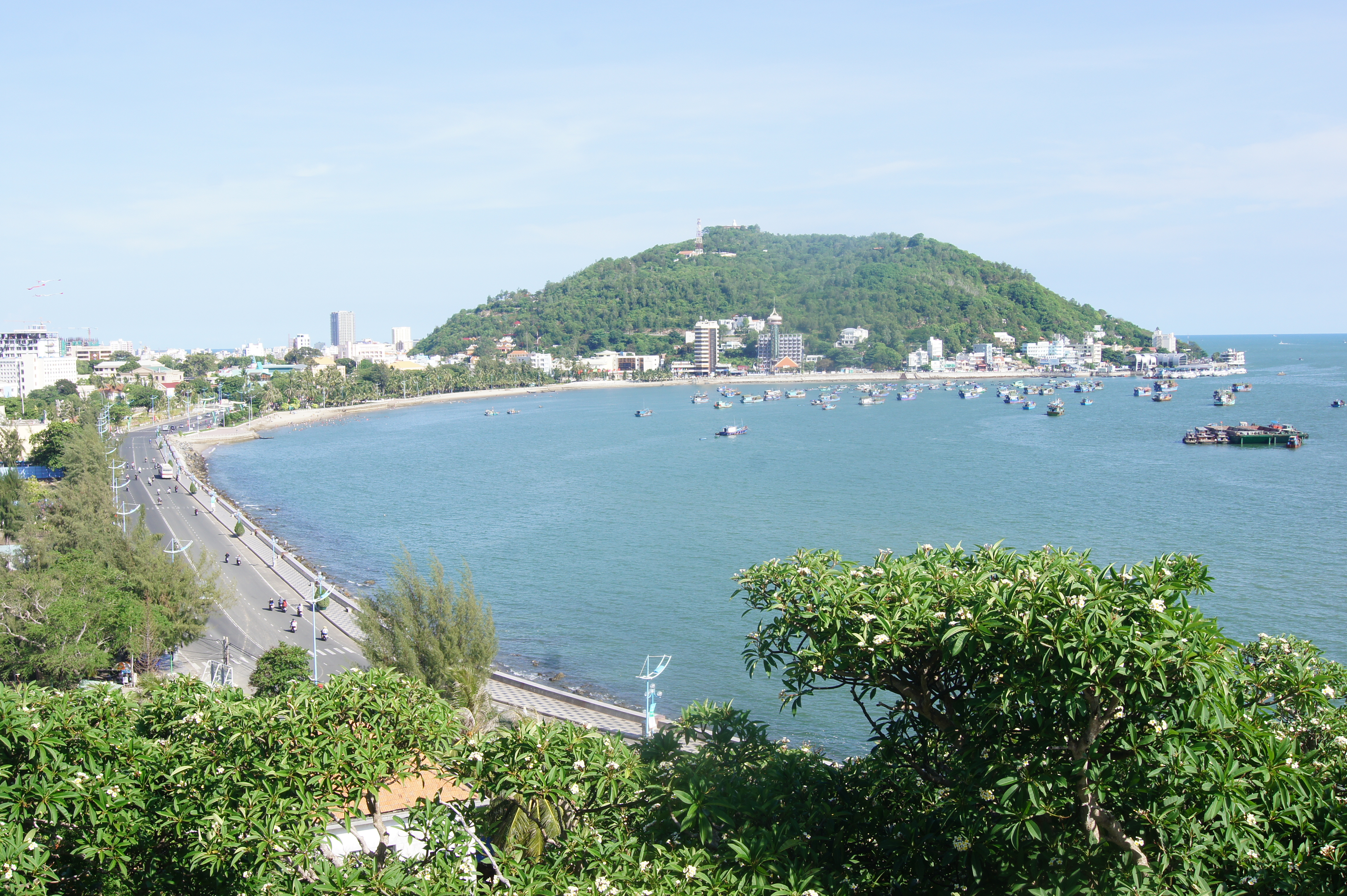
- Skyline of Saigon ward Ho Chi Minh City Hall Independence Palace Notre-Dame Cathedral Basilica of Saigon Landmark 81 Bến Thành Market Thủ Dầu Một central six-way intersection with Phú Cường Cathedral Coast of Vũng Tàu

- Seal
- Motto(s): Paulatim crescam (historical); Meaning: Little by little we grow
- Interactive map of Ho Chi Minh City
- Location within Vietnam Location within Southeast Asia Location within Asia
- Coordinates: 10°46′32″N 106°42′07″E
- Country: Vietnam
- Region: Southeast
- Founded: 1698
- Change of name: 1976
- Founder: Nguyễn Hữu Cảnh
- Named for: Ho Chi Minh
- Government center: Saigon ward
- Subdivisions: 113 wards, 54 communes and 1 special administrative region

Government
  - Type: Municipality
  - Body: Ho Chi Minh City People's Council
  - CPV Secretary: Trần Lưu Quang
  - Chairman of People's Council: Võ Văn Minh
  - Chairman of People's Committee: Nguyễn Văn Được
  - Chairman of Fatherland Front: Nguyễn Phước Lộc

Area
  - Centrally-governed city (special): 6,781 km^{2} (2,618 sq mi)
  - Metro: 30,595 km^{2} (11,813 sq mi)
- Elevation: 19 m (62 ft)

Population (2025)
  - Centrally-governed city (special): 14,002,598
  - Rank: 1st
  - Density: 2,067/km^{2} (5,350/sq mi)
  - Metro: 22,552,900
  - Metro density: 737.14/km^{2} (1,909.2/sq mi)
- Demonym: Saigonese

GDP (Nominal, 2023)
  - Municipality (Special): US$93.1 billion
  - Per capita: US$6,650
- Time zone: UTC+7 (Indochina Time)
- Postal code: 70xxx–74xxx
- Area codes: 28
- ISO 3166 code: VN-SG
- License plate: 41, 50–59
- HDI (2023): ▲0.829 (2nd)
- Rapid transit system: Ho Chi Minh City Metro
- Website: hochiminhcity.gov.vn

Ho Chi Minh City (HCMC; Vietnamese: Thành phố Hồ Chí Minh, [tʰaɲ˨˩ fow˦˥ ho˨˩ cɪj˦˥ mɨn˧˧]), formerly Saigon (Sài Gòn, [ʂaj˨˩ ɣɔŋ˨˩]), (Note: Saigon was the city's official name prior the fall of Saigon. After the event, Gia Định province was merged into Saigon, changing the city name to Saigon – Gia Định until the establishment of the Socialist Republic of Vietnam on July 2, 1976. Saigon has remained a colloquial name used in daily life and conversation of Vietnamese people since then. In 2025, Saigon ward was established as the city's administrative center based on the former District 1.) is the most populous city and centrally-governed city of Vietnam, with a population of more than 14 million in 2025. Its geography is defined by rivers and canals, of which the largest is the Saigon River.

As the biggest financial centre of Vietnam, Ho Chi Minh City has the largest gross regional domestic product out of all Vietnamese provinces and municipalities, contributing around a quarter of the country's total GDP. It is the busiest international transport hub in Vietnam, with Tân Sơn Nhất International Airport accounting for nearly half of all international arrivals to Vietnam, and the Port of Saigon among the busiest container ports in Southeast Asia. Ho Chi Minh City hosts various historic buildings and modern landmarks, including the Independence Palace, Bitexco Financial Tower, Landmark 81 Tower, the War Remnants Museum, and Bến Thành Market. The city is known for its alleyways and nightlife, most notably Phạm Ngũ Lão and Bùi Viện Street.

The area was initially part of Cambodian polities until it became part of the Vietnamese Nguyễn lords in 1698, as a result of Đại Việt's expansionist policy of Nam tiến. It served as the capital of the Nguyễn lords in their final years before the establishment of the Nguyễn dynasty in 1802. After the fall of the Citadel of Saigon during the Cochinchina campaign in 1859, it became the capital of French Cochinchina from 1862 to 1949. It was also the capital of French Indochina from 1887 to 1902, and again from 1945 until its cessation in 1954. After France recognized Vietnam's independence and unity, (Note: Nominally and partially independent until 4 June 1954 as an associated state of France.) it was the capital of the State of Vietnam from 1949 to 1955. Following the 1954 partition, it became the capital of South Vietnam until it was captured by North Vietnam, leading to a unified communist state in 1976. The city was subsequently renamed after North Vietnamese leader Ho Chi Minh, while Saigon remains in use informally and has been the official name of the city's administrative centre since 2025. The provinces of Bình Dương and Bà Rịa–Vũng Tàu were merged into Ho Chi Minh City in 2025, allowing the city to inherit the two former provinces' industrial and coastal metropolitan areas.

== Etymology ==
The first known human habitation in the area was a Cham settlement called Baigaur. The Cambodians then took over the Cham village of Baigaur and renamed it Prey Nokôr (ព្រៃនគរ, [prɛi̯ nɔkor]), a fishing village. Later, Vietnamese settlers arrived in this region in the early 17th century adopted and Vietised the Khmer name as Sài Gòn ( chữ Hán: 柴棍, [ʂaj˨˩ ɣɔŋ˨˩], pr spirantised to ʂ, k > ɣ).

Over time, under the control of the Vietnamese, it was officially renamed Gia Định (嘉定) in 1698, a name that was retained until the time of the French conquest in the 1860s, when it adopted the name Sài Gòn, francized as Saïgon, while the city was still indicated as 嘉定 on Vietnamese maps written in chữ Hán until at least 1891. An old name of Gia Định was Phan Yên 藩安, which was later glossed as Phiên An.

The name Ho Chi Minh City was given after reunification in 1976 to honour the late Ho Chi Minh. (Note: The text of the resolution is as follows: By the National Assembly of the Socialist Republic of Vietnam, 6th tenure, 1st session, for officially renaming Saigon-Gia Dinh City as Ho Chi Minh City. The National Assembly of the Socialist Republic of Vietnam Considering the boundless love of the people of Saigon-Gia Dinh City for Chairman Ho Chi Minh and their wish for the city to be named after him; Considering the long and difficult revolutionary struggle launched in Saigon-Gia Dinh City, with several glorious feats, deserves the honour of being named after Chairman Ho Chi Minh; After discussing the suggestion of the Presidium of the National Assembly's meeting;(PNAM) Decides to rename Saigon-Gia Dinh City as Ho Chi Minh City.) The informal name of Sài Gòn remains in daily speech. There is a technical difference between the two terms: Sài Gòn is used to refer to the city centre, aptly named Saigon and the adjacent neighborhoods of Bến Thành, Tân Định, Xuân Hòa while Ho Chi Minh City refers to all of its urban and rural area.

=== Saigon ===
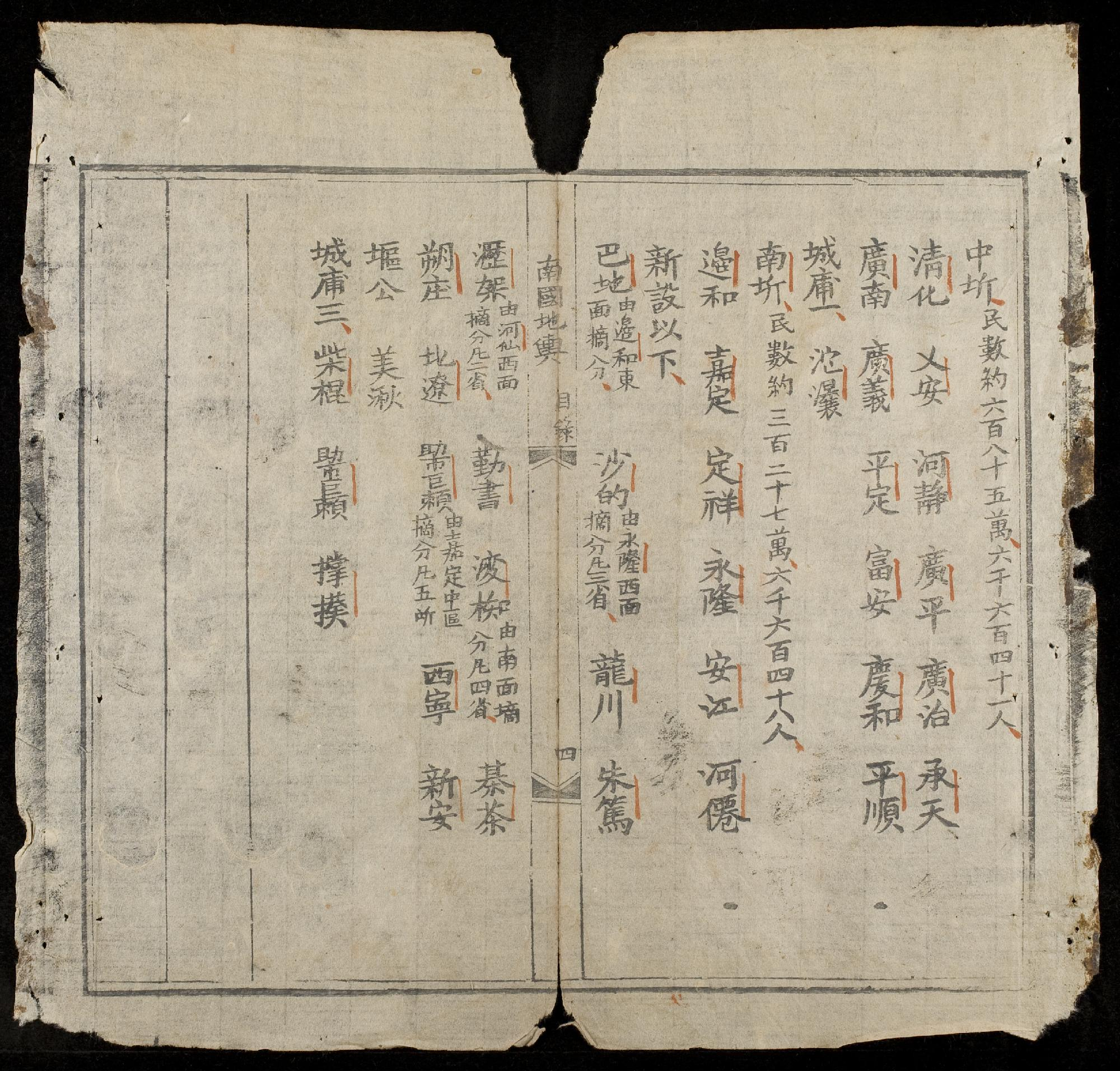
Saigon is written here as 柴棍 along with other Southern Vietnamese cities. (On the left of the page, first row after "城庯三")

The original toponym behind Sài Gòn was attested earliest as 柴棍, with two phonograms whose Sino-Vietnamese readings are "sài" and "côn" respectively.

In Lê Quý Đôn's "Miscellaneous Chronicles of the Pacified Frontier" (撫邊雜錄, Phủ biên tạp lục c. 1776), wherein he relates that, in 1674, Cambodian prince Ang Nan was installed as uparaja in 柴棍 (Sài Gòn) by Vietnamese forces.

柴棍 also appears later in Trịnh Hoài Đức's "Comprehensive Records about the Gia Định Citadel" (嘉定城通志, Gia Định thành thông chí, c. 1820), "Textbook on the Geography of the Southern Country" (南國地輿教科書, Nam quốc địa dư giáo khoa thư, 1908), etc.

Adrien Launay's Histoire de la Mission de Cochinchine (1688–1823), "Documents Historiques II: 1728 – 1771" (1924: 190) cites 1747 documents containing the toponyms: provincia Rai-gon, Rai-gon thong (for *Sài Gòn thượng "Upper Saigon"), & Rai-gon-ha (for *Sài Gòn hạ "Lower Saigon"). It is probably a transcription of Khmer ព្រៃនគរ (Prey Nokôr), (Note: "The Khmer name for Saigon, by the way, is Prey Nokor; "prey" means "forest", "nokor" "home" or "city".) or Khmer ព្រៃគរ (Prey Kôr).

There is a proposal that Sài Gòn is from the non-Sino-Vietnamese reading of Chinese 堤岸 ("embankment", tai4 ngon6, South Vietnamese: đê ngạn). (Note: "Un siècle plus tard (1773), la révolte des TÁYON [sic] [qu'éclata] tout, d'abord dans les montagnes de la province de Qui-Nhon, et s'étendit rapidement dans le sud, chassa de Bien-Hoa le mouvement commercial qu'y avaient attiré les Chinois. Ceux-ci abandonnèrent Cou-lao-pho, remontèrent de fleuve de Tan-Binh, et vinrent choisir la position actuele de CHOLEN. Cette création date d'environ 1778. Ils appelèrent leur nouvelle résidence TAI-NGON ou TIN-GAN. Le nom transformé par les Annamites en celui de SAIGON fut depuis appliqué à tort, par l'expédition française, au SAIGON actuel dont la dénomination locale est BEN-NGHE ou BEN-THANH.")

=== Ho Chi Minh City ===
The name commemorates Ho Chi Minh, the first leader of the Democratic Republic of Vietnam. This name, while not his given name, was one he favored throughout his later years. It combines a Vietnamese surname (Hồ, 胡) with a given name meaning "enlightened will" (from Sino-Vietnamese, 志明; Chí meaning 'will' or 'spirit', and Minh meaning 'light'), in essence, meaning "light bringer". "Saigon" is still used as a semi-official name for the city, in some cases being used interchangeably with Ho Chi Minh City, partly due to its longer history and familiarity.

== History ==
=== Early settlement ===
The earliest settlement in the area was a Funan temple at the location of what later is the Phụng Sơn Buddhist temple, founded in the 4th century AD. A settlement called Baigaur was established on the site in the 11th century by the Champa. Baigaur was renamed Prey Nokor after conquest by the Khmer Empire around 1145, Prey Nokor grew on the site of a fishing village and area of forest.

The first Vietnamese people crossed the sea to explore this land completely without the organisation of the Nguyễn Lords. Thanks to the marriage between Princess Nguyễn Phúc Ngọc Vạn – daughter of Lord Nguyễn Phúc Nguyên – and the King of Cambodia Chey Chettha II in 1620, the relationship between Vietnam and Cambodia became smooth, and the people of the two countries could freely move back and forth. In exchange, Chey Chettha II gifted Prei Nokor to the Nguyễn lords.

=== Nguyễn dynasty ===
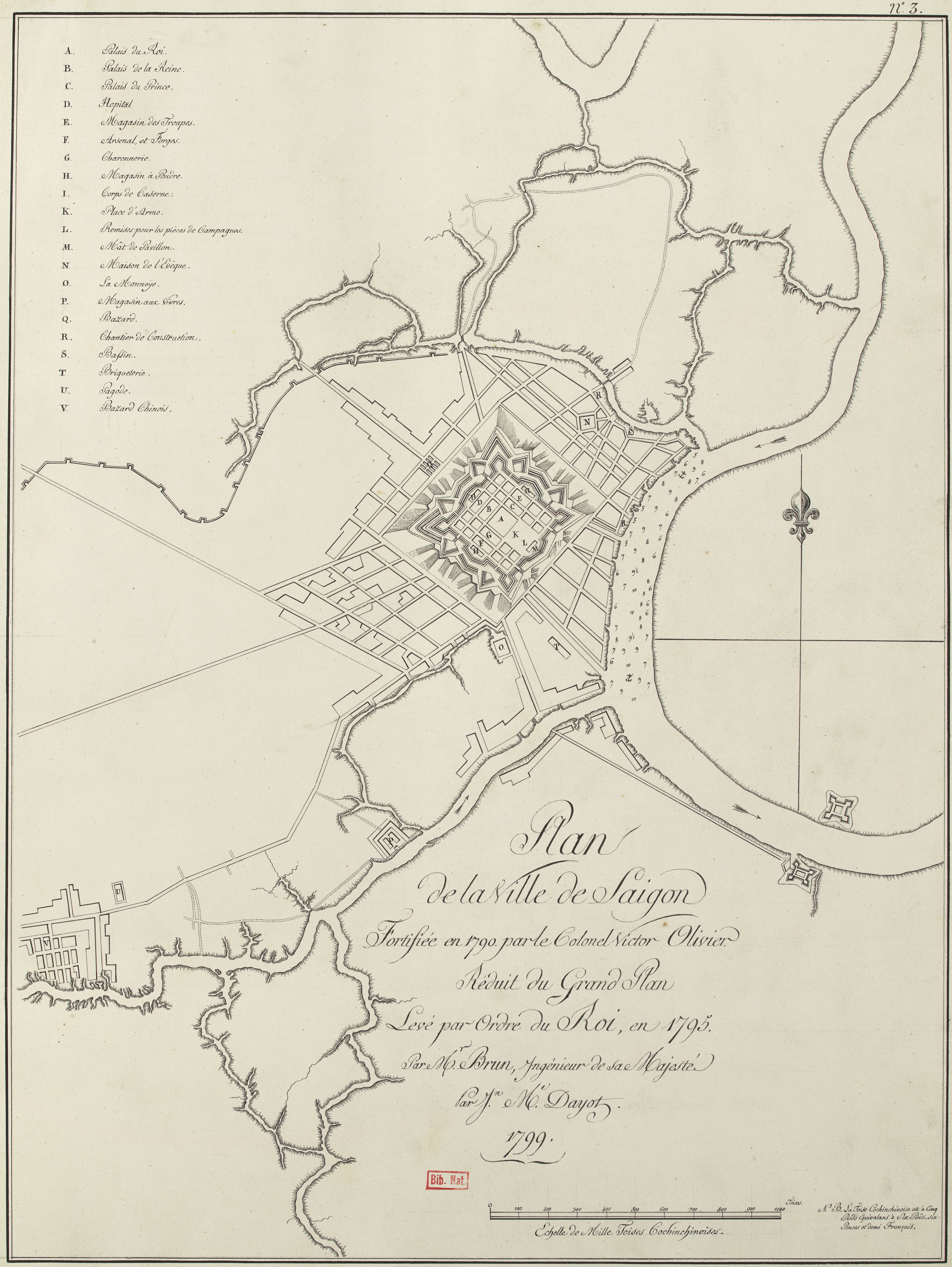
Thành Bát Quái (Citadel of Eight Trigrams) or Thành Quy (Citadel of Tortoise) in 1795.

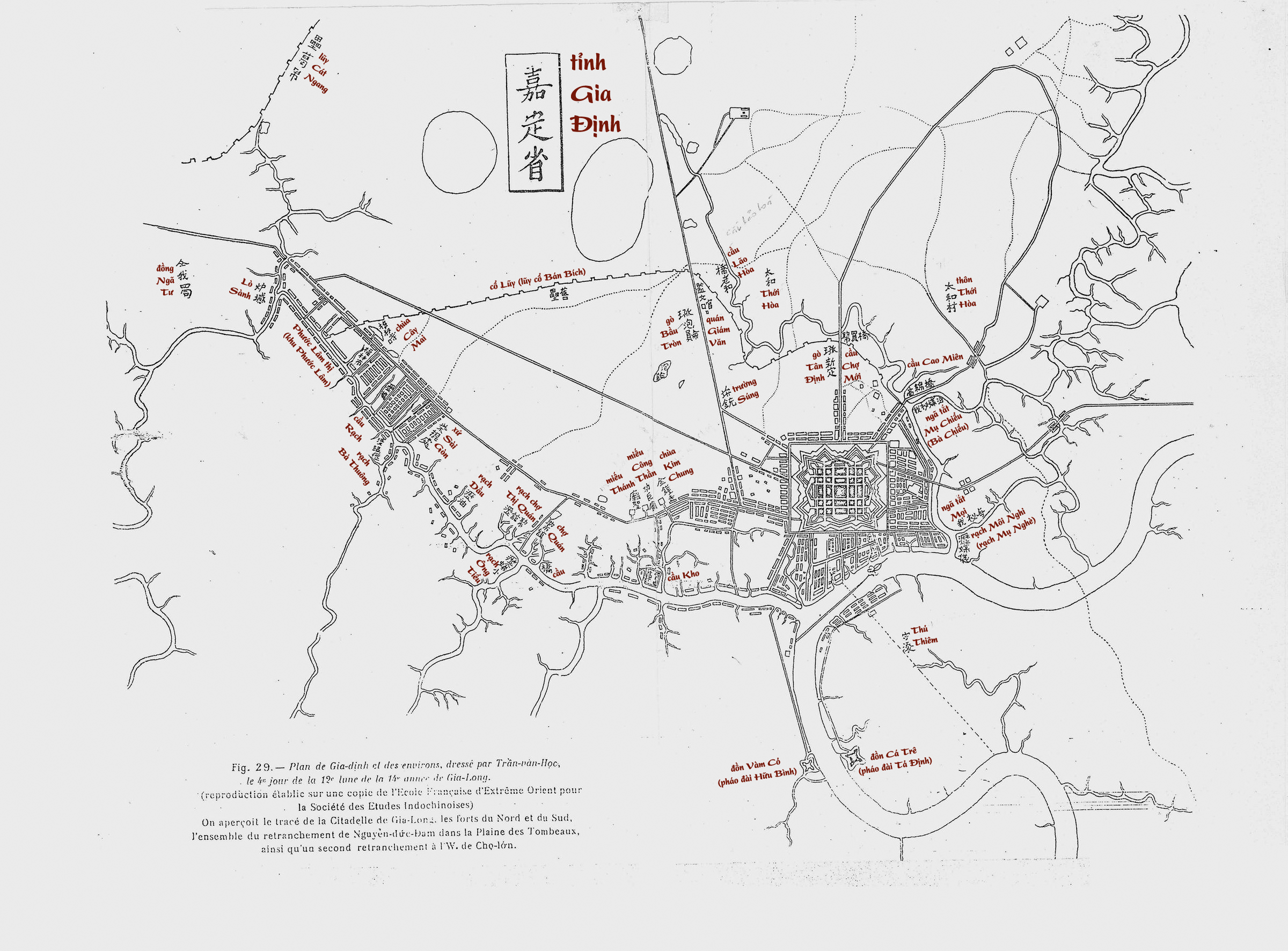
Map of Gia Định in 1815

In 1679, Lord Nguyễn Phúc Tần allowed a group of Chinese refugees from the Qing dynasty to settle in Mỹ Tho, Biên Hòa and Saigon to seek refuge. In 1698, Nguyễn Hữu Cảnh, a Vietnamese noble, was sent by the Nguyễn rulers of Huế by sea to establish Vietnamese administrative structures in the area, thus detaching the area from Cambodia, which was not strong enough to intervene. He is credited with the expansion of Saigon into a significant settlement.

King Chey Chettha IV of Cambodia tried to stop the Vietnamese and was defeated by Nguyễn Hữu Cảnh in 1700. In February 1700, he invaded Cambodia from An Giang. In March, the Vietnamese expedition under Cảnh and a Chinese general Trần Thượng Xuyên (Chen Shangchuan) defeated the main Cambodian army at Bích Đôi citadel, king Chey Chettha IV took flight while his nephew Ang Em surrendered to the invaders, as the Vietnamese marched onto and captured Cambodia's capital Phnom Penh. As a result, Saigon and Long An were officially and securely obtained by the Nguyễn, more Vietnamese settlers moved into the newly conquered lands.

In 1788, Nguyễn Ánh captured the city, and used it as a centre of resistance against Tây Sơn. Two years later, a Vauban citadel called Gia Định, or Thành Bát Quái ("Eight Diagrams") was built by Victor Olivier de Puymanel, one of the Nguyễn Ánh's French mercenaries.

The citadel was captured by Lê Văn Khôi during his revolt of 1833–35 against emperor Minh Mạng. Following the revolt, Minh Mạng ordered it to be dismantled, and a new citadel, called Phụng Thành, was built in 1836. In 1859, the citadel was destroyed by the French following the Battle of Kỳ Hòa. Initially called Gia Định, the Vietnamese city became Saigon in the 18th century.

=== French colony ===
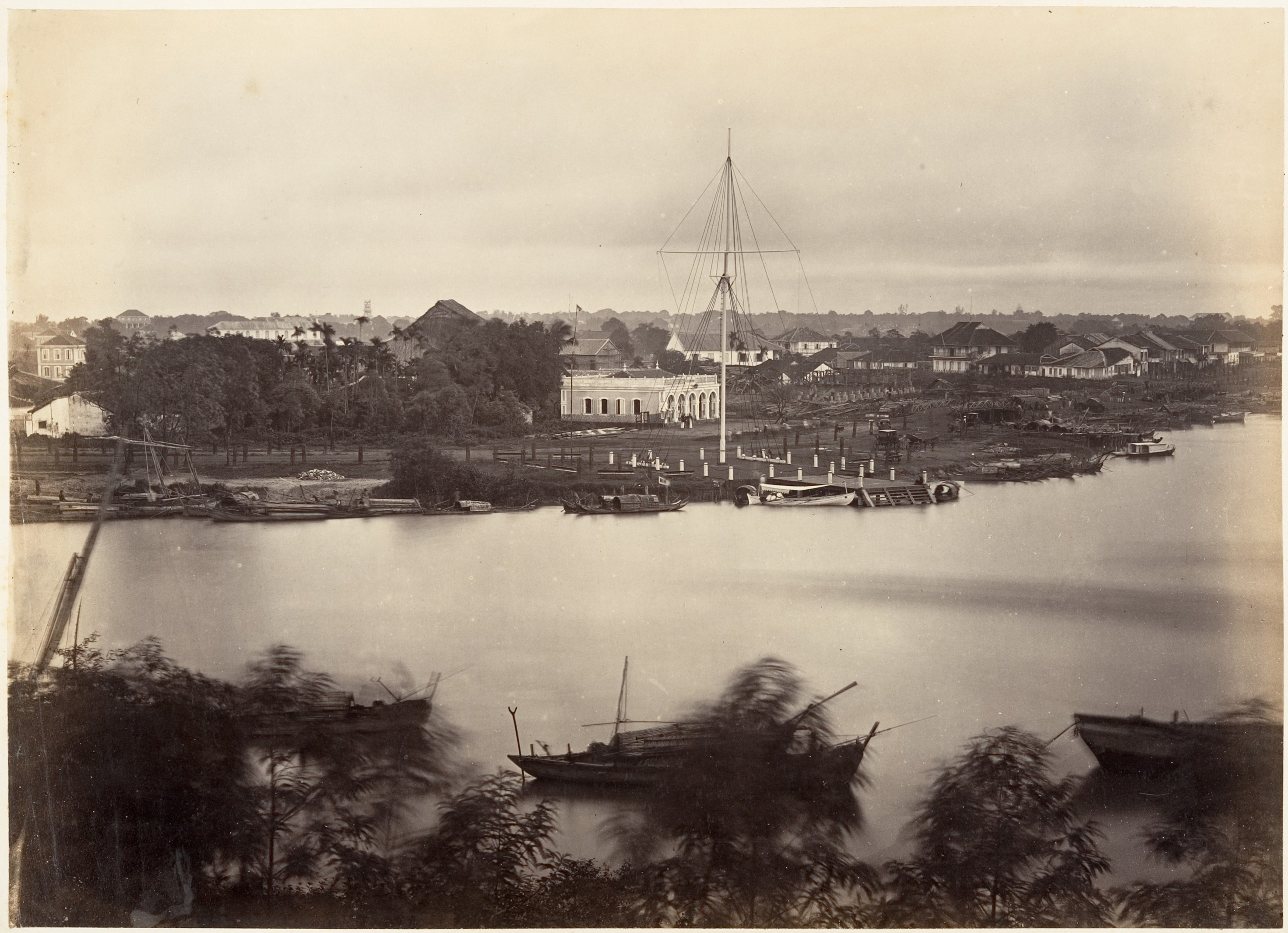
Thủ Ngữ flag pole, Saigon taken in 1866 by Émile Gsell.

Ceded to France by the 1862 Treaty of Saigon, the city was planned by the French to transform into a town for colonization. During the 19th and 20th centuries, construction of French-style buildings began, including a botanical garden, the Norodom Palace, Hotel Continental, Notre-Dame Cathedral, and Bến Thành Market, among others. In April 1865, Gia Định Báo was established in Saigon, becoming the first newspaper published in Vietnam. During the French colonial era, Saigon became known as "Pearl of the Orient" (Hòn ngọc Viễn Đông), or "Paris of the Extreme Orient".

On 27 April 1931, a new région called Saigon–Cholon consisting of Saigon and Cholon was formed; the name Cholon was dropped after South Vietnam gained independence from France in 1955. From about 256,000 in 1930, Saigon's population rose to 1.2 million in 1950.

Gallery of Saigon during the French colonial era

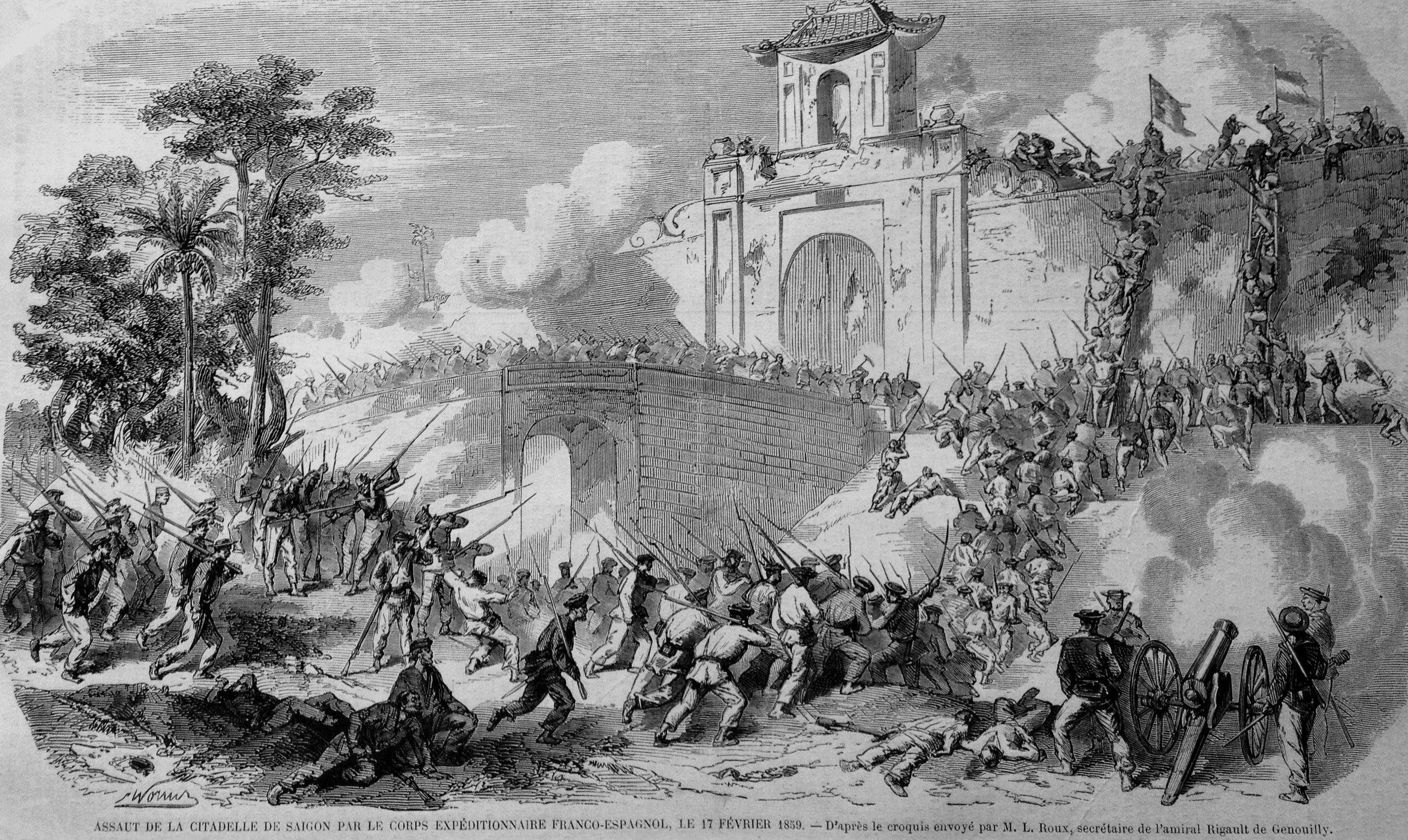
The Siege of Saigon fortress in 1859 by Franco-Spanish forces.

Coat of arms of Saigon established during French colonial administration and used from 1870 to 1975.

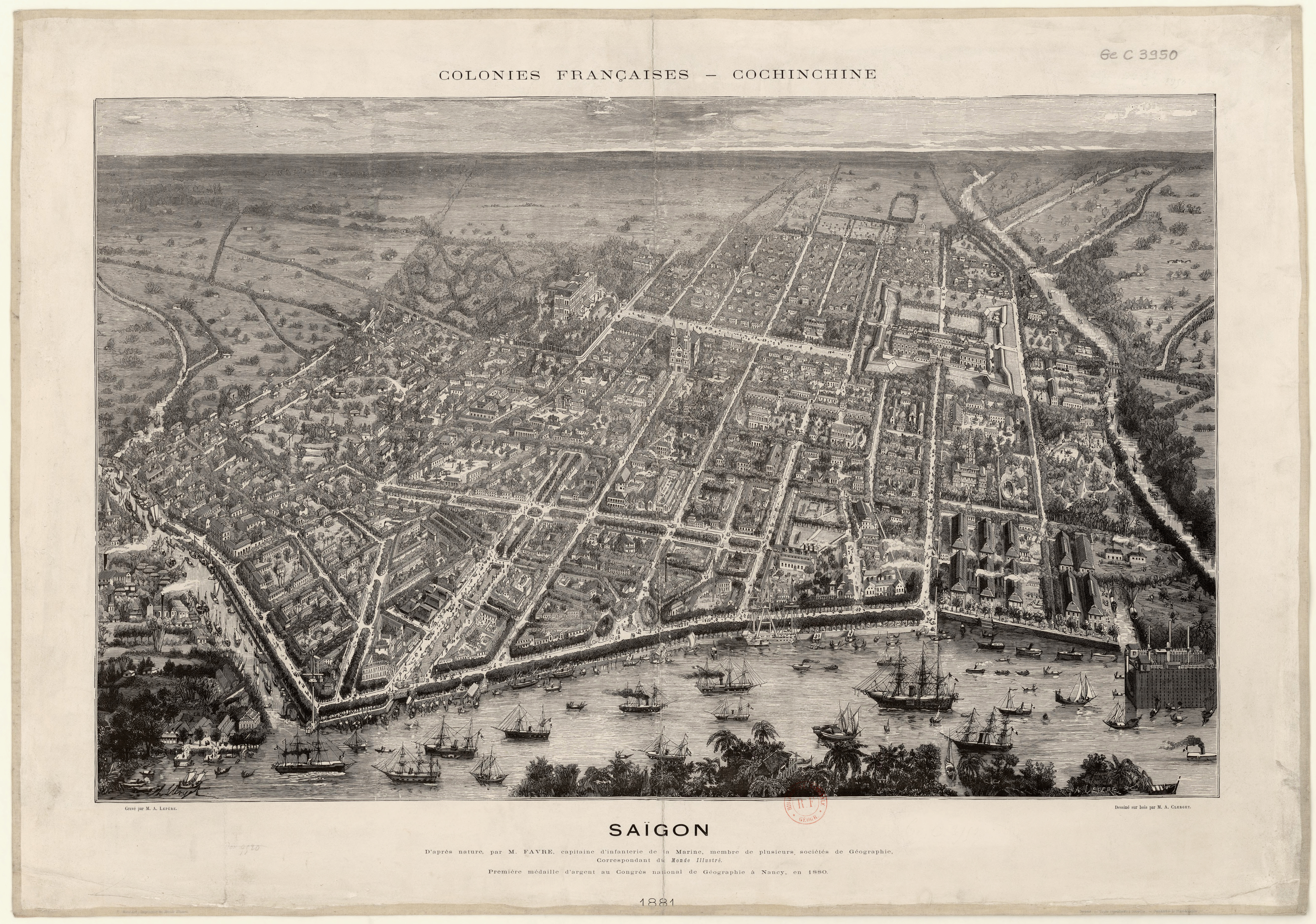
Map of Saigon in 1881.

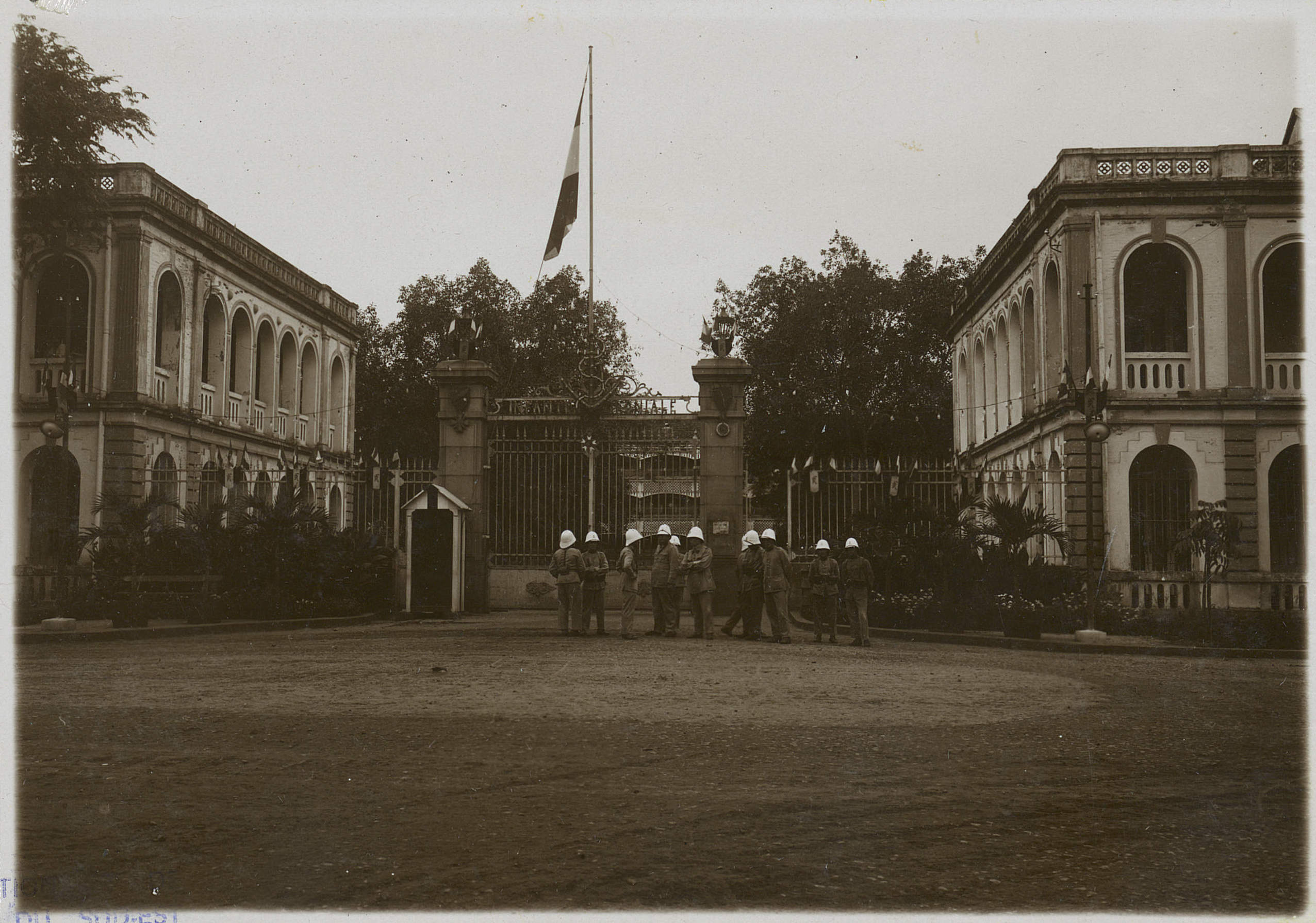
French soldiers stationed at a barrack in Saigon in 1930.

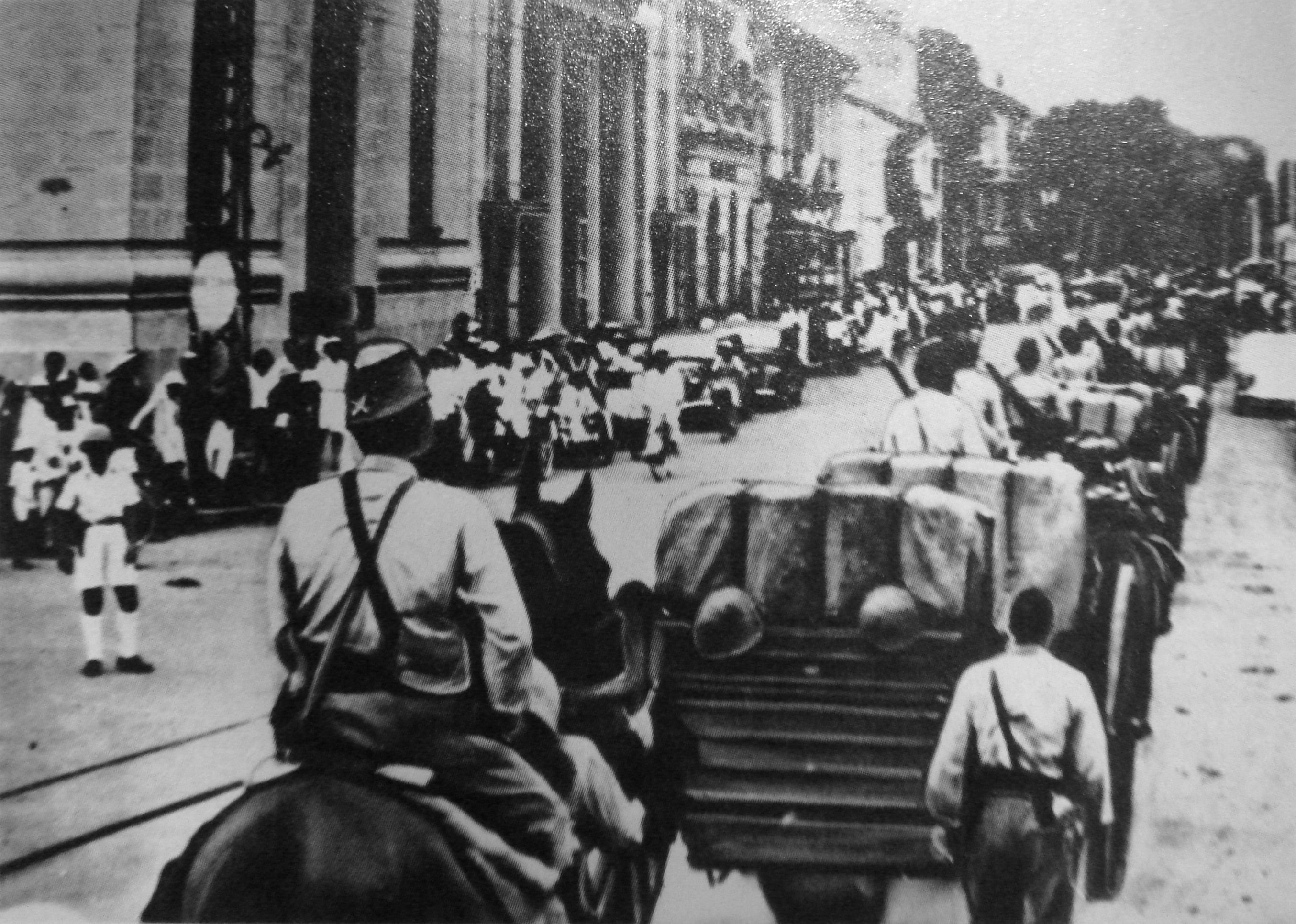
Imperial Japanese soldiers entering Saigon in 1941, during World War II.

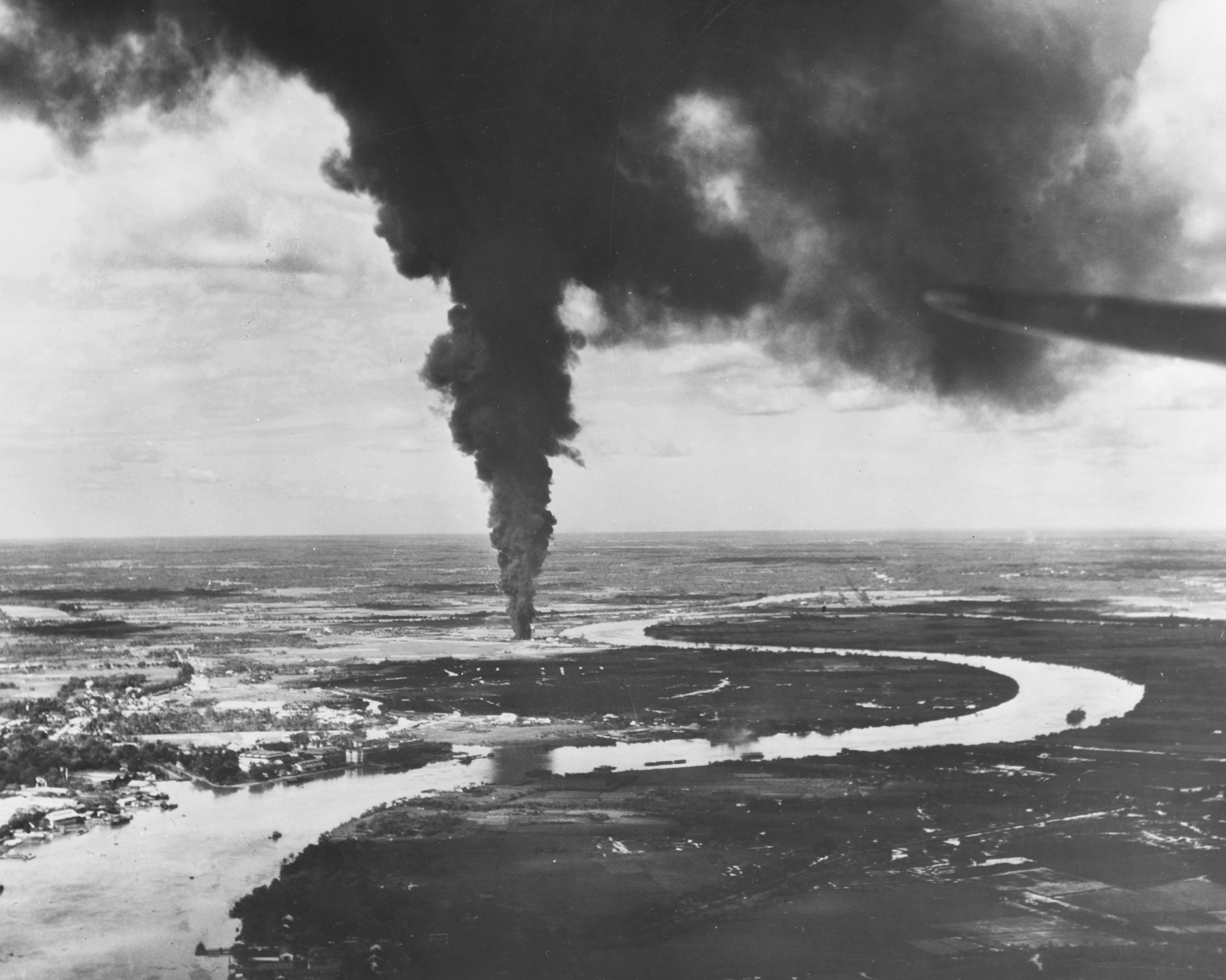
Saigon afire after aerial attacks from carrier-based planes of the US Pacific Fleet in 1945.

=== State of Vietnam, and Republic of Vietnam ===
On 14 June 1949, 10 days after France returned Cochinchina to Vietnam, former emperor Bảo Đại made Saigon the capital of the State of Vietnam within the French Union with himself as head of state. The state was proclaimed in July. In July 1954, the Geneva Agreement partitioned Vietnam along the 17th parallel (Bến Hải River), with the Việt Minh, under Ho Chi Minh, gaining complete control of the northern half of the country, while the southern half remained under the rule of the State of Vietnam.

The State officially became the Republic of Vietnam when Bảo Đại was deposed by his Prime Minister Ngô Đình Diệm in the 1955 referendum, with Saigon as its capital. On 22 October 1956, the city was given the official name, Đô thành Sài Gòn ("Metropolitan city of Saigon"). After the decree of 27 March 1959 came into effect, Saigon was divided into eight districts and 41 wards.

In December 1966, two wards from the old An Khánh Commune of Gia Định, were formed into District 1, then seceded later to become District 9. In July 1969, District 10 and District 11 were founded, and by 1975, the city's area consisted of eleven districts, Gia Định, Củ Chi District (Hậu Nghĩa), and Phú Hòa District (Bình Dương).

Saigon served as the financial, industrial and transport centre of the Republic of Vietnam. In the 1950s, with the U.S. providing nearly $2 billion in aid to the Diệm regime, the country's economy grew more rapidly under the capitalist model; by 1960, over half of South Vietnam's factories were located in Saigon. Beginning in the 1960s, Saigon experienced economic downturn and higher inflation, as it was completely dependent on U.S. aid and imports from other countries. As a result of urbanisation, with the population reaching 3.3 million by 1970, the city was described by the USAID as being turned "into a huge slum". The city had "prostitutes, drug addicts, corrupt officials, beggars, orphans, and Americans with money", and according to Stanley Karnow, it was "a black-market city in the largest sense of the word".

On 28 April 1955, the Vietnamese National Army launched an attack against Bình Xuyên military force in the city. The battle lasted until May, killing an estimated 500 people and leaving about 20,000 homeless. Ngô Đình Diệm then later turned on other paramilitary groups in Saigon, including the Hòa Hảo Buddhist reform movement. On 11 June 1963, Buddhist monk Thích Quảng Đức self-immolated in the city, in protest of the Diệm regime. On 2 November of the same year, Diệm was assassinated in Saigon, in a successful coup by Dương Văn Minh.

During the 1968 Tet Offensive, communist forces launched a failed attempt to capture the city. Seven years later, on 30 April 1975, Saigon was captured, ending the Vietnam War, and the city came under the control of the Vietnamese People's Army.

Gallery of Saigon during the Republic of Vietnam era

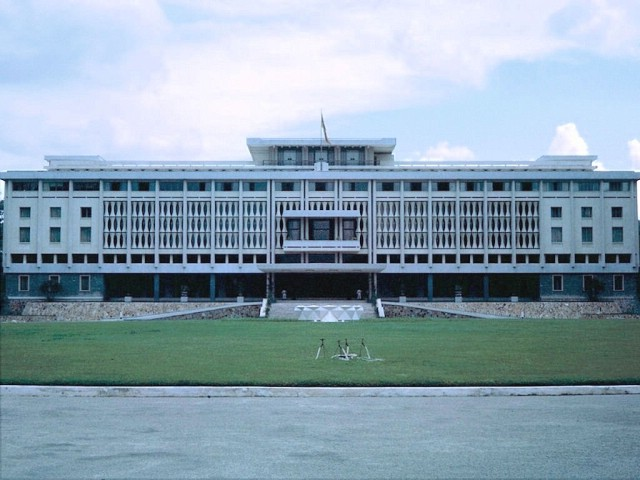
The Independence Palace in 1967. It was the official residence and workplace of the President of South Vietnam.

The Saigon Opera House as seen from Tự Do (Liberty) Street in 1967.

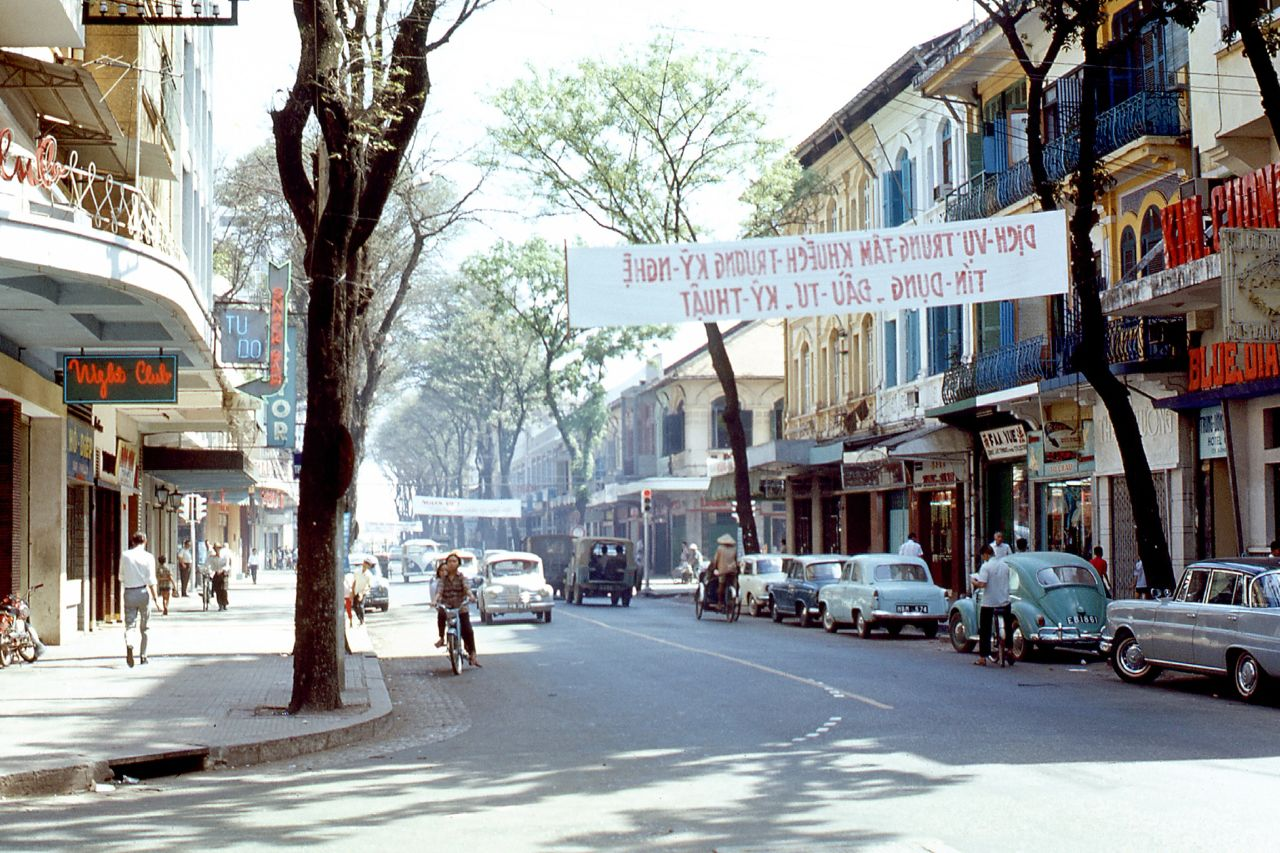
Street view of Saigon in 1968.

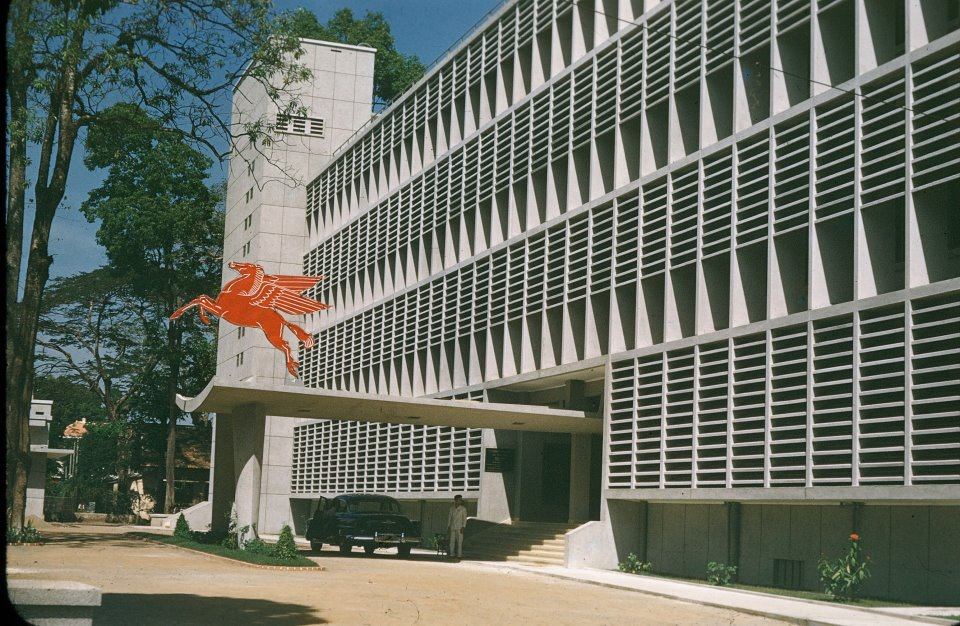
The headquarters of StanVac (now part of Exxon) is an example of Vietnamese modernist architecture which boomed during the era.

=== Socialist Republic of Vietnam ===
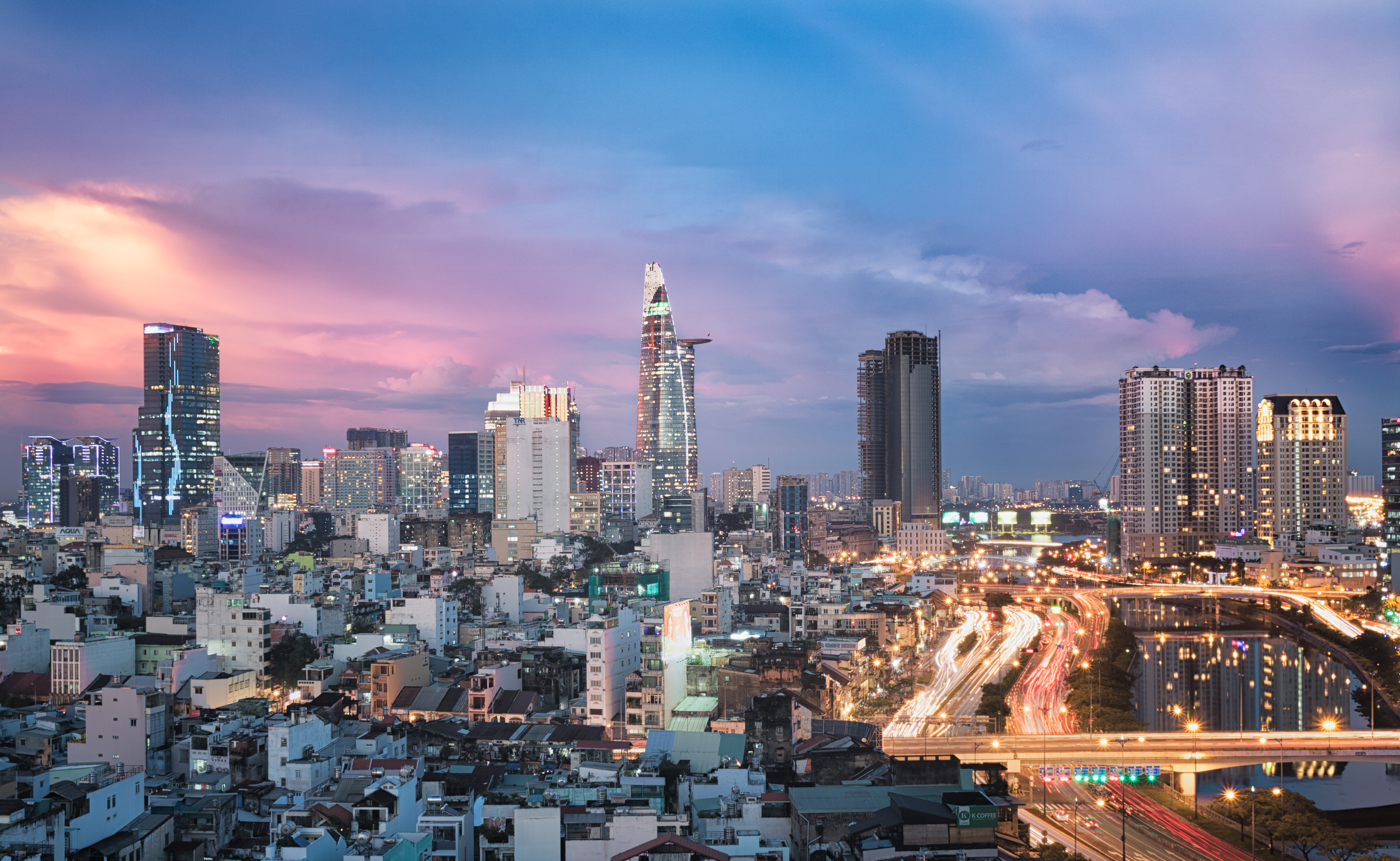
Ho Chi Minh City during sunset (November 2017)

In July 1976, upon the establishment of the unified Socialist Republic of Vietnam, the city of Saigon (including the Cholon area), the province of Gia Ðịnh and two suburban districts of two other nearby provinces were combined to create Ho Chi Minh City, in honour of the late Communist leader Ho Chi Minh. At the time, the city covered an area of 1,295.5 square kilometres (500.2 sq mi) with eight districts and five rurals: Thủ Đức, Hóc Môn, Củ Chi, Bình Chánh, and Nhà Bè. Since 1978, administrative divisions in the city have been revised multiple times, including in 2020, when District 2, District 9, and Thủ Đức District were consolidated to form a municipal city. On 29 October 2002, 60 people died and 90 were injured in the International Trade Center building fire in Ho Chi Minh City.

Ho Chi Minh City, along with its surrounding provinces and municipalities, is regarded as "the manufacturing hub" of Vietnam, and "an attractive business hub". In terms of cost, it was ranked the 178th-most expensive major city in the world according to the Mercer Cost Of Living 2024 survey of 226 cities. In terms of international connectedness, as of 2024, the city was classified as a "Beta+" city by the Globalization and World Cities Research Network.

== Geography ==
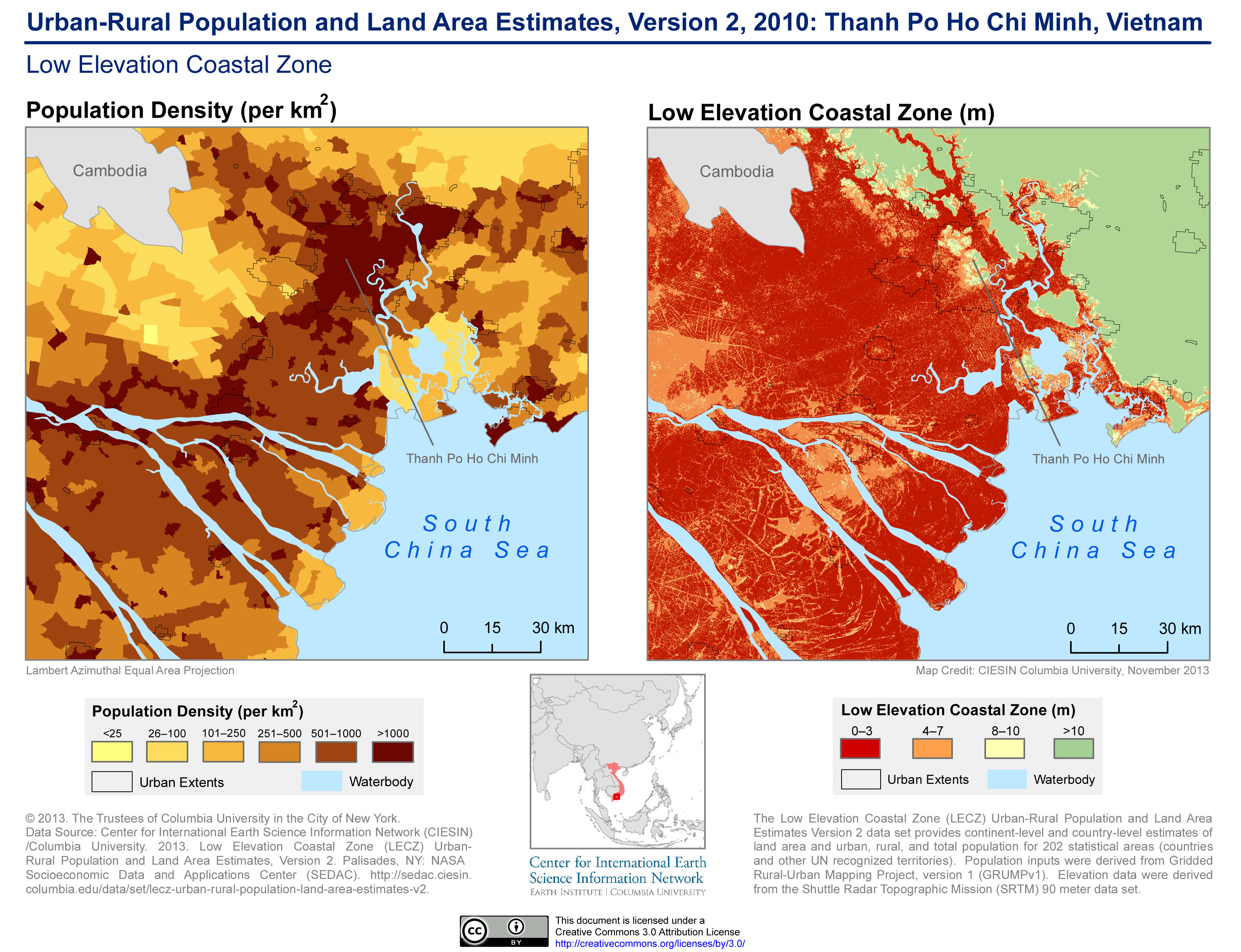
Population density and elevation above sea level in the city (2010). Ho Chi Minh City is vulnerable to sea level rise.

The city is located in Southeast Vietnam. The average elevation is 5 m (16 ft) above sea level for the city centre and 16 m (52 ft) for the suburb areas. It borders the Tây Ninh province and Đồng Nai municipality to the north, Đồng Nai and Lâm Đồng province to the east, Tây Ninh to the west, and Đồng Tháp province and the South China Sea to the south with a coast 89 km (55 mi) long. The city covers an area of 6.772 km^{2} (2.615 sq mi) or 2% of the surface area of Vietnam, extending up to Minh Thạnh commune (20 km or 12 mi from the Memot in Cambodia) and down to Côn Đảo special administrative region. The municipality also extends far to the east to Bình Châu (110 km (68 mi) from the city center). Due to its location on the Mekong Delta, the city is fringed by tidal flats that have been modified for agriculture.

=== Flooding ===
During the rainy season, a combination of tide, rains, flow volume in the Saigon River and Đồng Nai River and land subsidence results in flooding in parts of the city. A once-in-100 year flood would cause 23% of the city to undergo flooding.

=== Climate ===
Ho Chi Minh City, Vietnam

Climate chart (precipitation, max. and min. temperature)
J	F	M	A	M	J	J	A	S	O	N	D
12 32 23	8 33 23	18 34 25	57 35 26	202 35 26	224 34 26	231 33 25	219 33 25	490 33 25	340 32 25	128 32 25	41 32 24
- █ Average max. and min. temperatures in °C
- █ Precipitation totals in mm
- Source: Vietnam Institute for Building Science and Technology World Meteorological Organization (rainfall)
Imperial conversion
J	F	M	A	M	J	J	A	S	O	N	D
0.5 90 74	0.3 91 74	0.7 92 77	2.2 94 80	8 95 80	8.8 92 78	9.1 91 77	8.6 91 77	19 91 77	13 90 77	5 90 77	1.6 89 76
- █ Average max. and min. temperatures in °F
- █ Precipitation totals in inches

The city has a tropical climate, specifically tropical savanna (Aw), with an average humidity of 78–82%. The year is divided into two seasons. The rainy season, with an average rainfall of about 1,800 mm (71 in) annually (about 150 rainy days per year), usually lasts from May to November. The dry season lasts from December to April.

The average temperature is 28 °C (82 °F). The highest temperature recorded was 40.0 °C (104 °F) in April while the lowest temperature recorded was 13.8 °C (57 °F) in January. On average, the city experiences between 2,400 and 2,700 hours of sunshine per year.

Climate data for Ho Chi Minh City (Tan Son Nhat International Airport)
Month	Jan	Feb	Mar	Apr	May	Jun	Jul	Aug	Sep	Oct	Nov	Dec	Year
Record high °C (°F)	36.4 (97.5)	38.7 (101.7)	39.4 (102.9)	40.0 (104.0)	39.0 (102.2)	37.5 (99.5)	35.2 (95.4)	36.1 (97.0)	35.3 (95.5)	34.9 (94.8)	35.0 (95.0)	36.3 (97.3)	40.0 (104.0)
Mean daily maximum °C (°F)	32.0 (89.6)	32.7 (90.9)	33.6 (92.5)	34.5 (94.1)	34.9 (94.8)	33.5 (92.3)	33.0 (91.4)	32.9 (91.2)	32.6 (90.7)	32.3 (90.1)	32.4 (90.3)	31.6 (88.9)	33.0 (91.4)
Daily mean °C (°F)	27.3 (81.1)	27.5 (81.5)	28.1 (82.6)	29.3 (84.7)	29.5 (85.1)	28.8 (83.8)	28.4 (83.1)	28.3 (82.9)	28.1 (82.6)	28.0 (82.4)	28.0 (82.4)	27.3 (81.1)	28.2 (82.8)
Mean daily minimum °C (°F)	23.4 (74.1)	23.1 (73.6)	24.9 (76.8)	26.4 (79.5)	26.4 (79.5)	25.5 (77.9)	25.2 (77.4)	25.1 (77.2)	25.0 (77.0)	25.0 (77.0)	24.9 (76.8)	23.9 (75.0)	24.9 (76.8)
Record low °C (°F)	13.8 (56.8)	16.0 (60.8)	17.5 (63.5)	20.0 (68.0)	21.1 (70.0)	20.4 (68.7)	19.4 (66.9)	20.0 (68.0)	20.8 (69.4)	19.8 (67.6)	17.6 (63.7)	13.9 (57.0)	13.8 (56.8)
Average rainfall mm (inches)	12 (0.5)	8 (0.3)	18 (0.7)	57 (2.2)	202 (8.0)	224 (8.8)	231 (9.1)	219 (8.6)	490 (19.3)	340 (13.4)	128 (5.0)	41 (1.6)	1,970 (77.5)
Average rainy days	2.0	1.0	1.0	4.0	13.0	16.0	19.0	17.0	18.0	16.0	9.0	5.0	121
Average relative humidity (%)	72	70	70	72	79	82	83	83	85	84	80	77	78
Average dew point °C (°F)	21.8 (71.2)	21.5 (70.7)	22.1 (71.8)	23.7 (74.7)	25.5 (77.9)	25.4 (77.7)	25.2 (77.4)	25.1 (77.2)	25.3 (77.5)	25.0 (77.0)	24.2 (75.6)	22.9 (73.2)	24.0 (75.2)
Mean monthly sunshine hours	245	246	272	239	195	171	180	172	162	182	200	226	2,490
Source 1: Vietnam Institute for Building Science and Technology
Source 2: World Meteorological Organization (rainfall)

== Administration ==
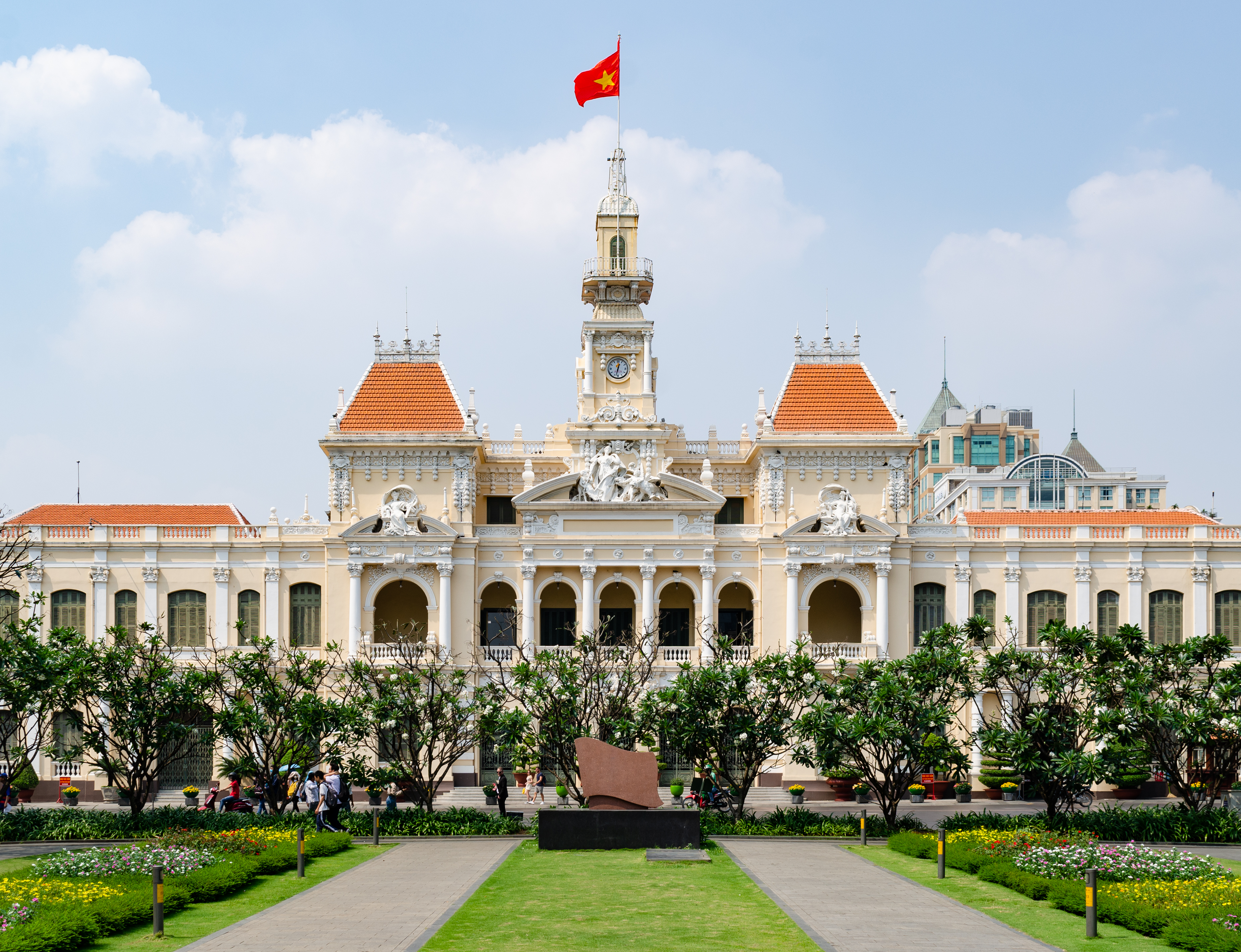
Ho Chi Minh City Hall is the administrative building of the city's government.

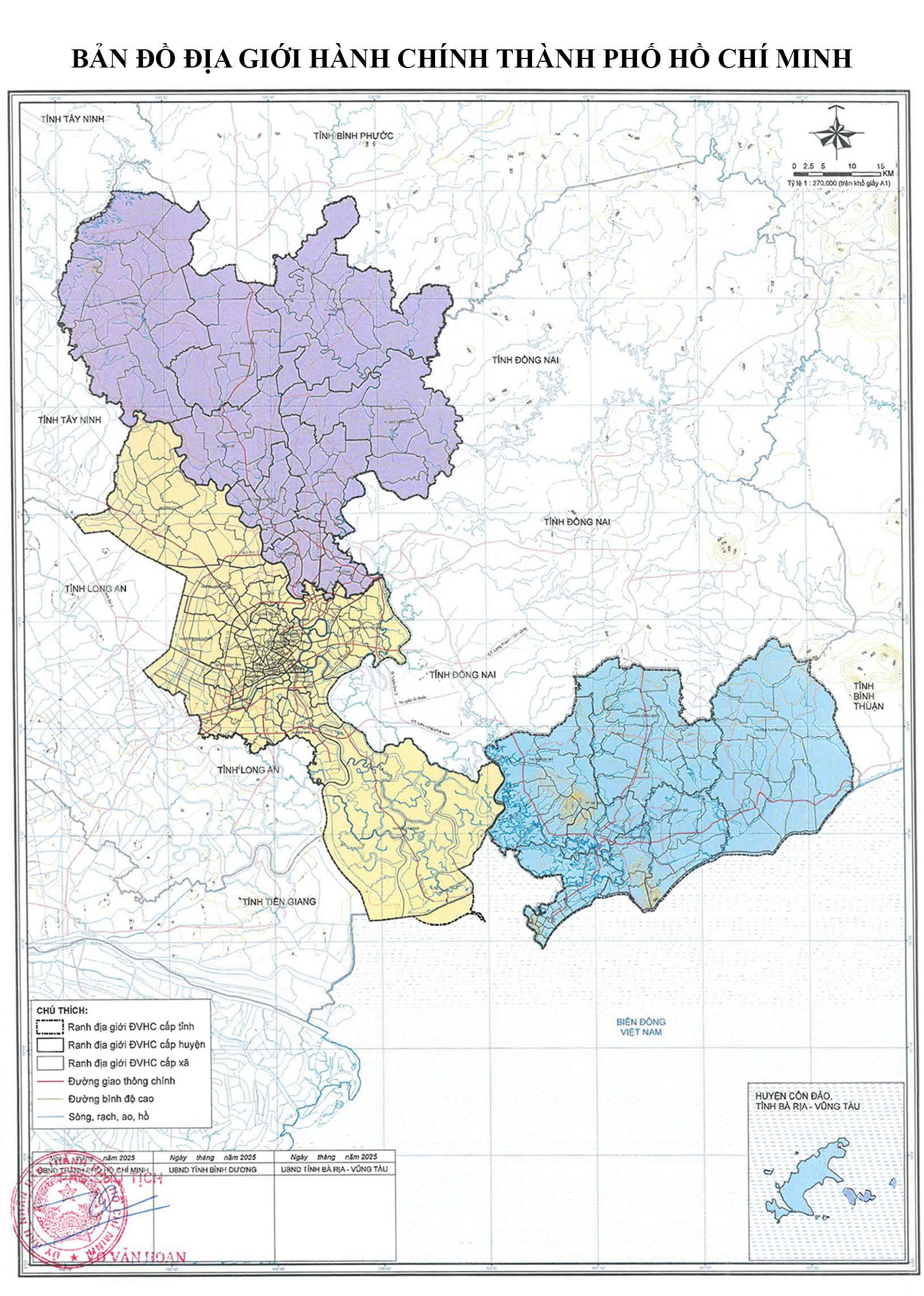
The formal map of Ho Chi Minh City (yellow) after merging with Bình Dương province (purple) and Bà Rịa–Vũng Tàu province (blue). This image contents some obsolete designations.

Ho Chi Minh City is a municipality at the same level as Vietnam's provinces, and as of 2025 is divided into the following administrative subdivisions:

113 wards (2,023.6266 km^{2} or 781.3266 sq mi in area), which are designated as urban or suburban (phường):

- An Đông
- An Hội Đông
- An Hội Tây
- An Khánh
- An Lạc
- An Nhơn
- An Phú
- An Phú Đông
- Bà Rịa
- Bàn Cờ
- Bảy Hiền
- Bến Cát
- Bến Thành
- Bình Cơ
- Bình Dương
- Bình Đông
- Bình Hòa
- Bình Hưng Hòa
- Bình Lợi Trung
- Bình Phú
- Bình Quới
- Bình Tân
- Bình Tây
- Bình Thạnh
- Bình Thới
- Bình Tiên
- Bình Trị Đông
- Bình Trưng
- Cát Lái
- Cầu Kiệu
- Cầu Ông Lãnh
- Chánh Hiệp
- Chánh Hưng
- Chánh Phú Hòa
- Chợ Lớn
- Chợ Quán
- Dĩ An
- Diên Hồng
- Đông Hòa
- Đông Hưng Thuận
- Đức Nhuận
- Gia Định
- Gò Vấp
- Hạnh Thông
- Hiệp Bình
- Hòa Bình
- Hòa Hưng
- Hòa Lợi
- Khánh Hội
- Lái Thiêu
- Linh Xuân
- Long Bình
- Long Hương
- Long Nguyên
- Long Phước
- Long Trường
- Minh Phụng
- Nhiêu Lộc
- Phú An
- Phú Định
- Phú Lâm
- Phú Lợi
- Phú Mỹ
- Phú Nhuận
- Phú Thạnh
- Phú Thọ
- Phú Thọ Hòa
- Phú Thuận
- Phước Long
- Phước Thắng
- Rạch Dừa
- Sài Gòn
- Tam Bình
- Tam Long
- Tam Thắng
- Tăng Nhơn Phú
- Tân Bình
- Tân Định
- Tân Đông Hiệp
- Tân Hải
- Tân Hòa
- Tân Hiệp
- Tân Hưng
- Tân Khánh
- Tân Mỹ
- Tân Phú
- Tân Phước
- Tân Sơn
- Tân Sơn Hòa
- Tân Sơn Nhất
- Tân Sơn Nhì
- Tân Tạo
- Tân Thành
- Tân Thới Hiệp
- Tân Thuận
- Tân Uyên
- Tây Nam
- Tây Thạnh
- Thạnh Mỹ Tây
- Thông Tây Hội
- Thới An
- Thới Hòa
- Thủ Dầu Một
- Thủ Đức
- Thuận An
- Thuận Giao
- Trung Mỹ Tây
- Vĩnh Hội
- Vĩnh Tân
- Vũng Tàu
- Vườn Lài
- Xóm Chiếu
- Xuân Hòa

54 communes (4,682.001 km^{2} or 1,807.731 sq mi in area), which are designated as rural (xã):

- An Long
- An Nhơn Tây
- An Thới Đông
- Bà Điểm
- Bàu Bàng
- Bàu Lâm
- Bắc Tân Uyên
- Bình Chánh
- Bình Châu
- Bình Giã
- Bình Hưng
- Bình Khánh
- Bình Lợi
- Bình Mỹ
- Cần Giờ
- Châu Đức
- Châu Pha
- Củ Chi
- Dầu Tiếng
- Đất Đỏ
- Đông Thạnh
- Hiệp Phước
- Hòa Hiệp
- Hòa Hội
- Hóc Môn
- Hồ Tràm
- Hưng Long
- Kim Long
- Long Điền
- Long Hải
- Long Hòa
- Long Sơn
- Minh Thạnh
- Ngãi Giao
- Nghĩa Thành
- Nhà Bè
- Nhuận Đức
- Phú Giáo
- Phú Hòa Đông
- Phước Hải
- Phước Hòa
- Phước Thành
- Tân An Hội
- Tân Nhựt
- Tân Vĩnh Lộc
- Thanh An
- Thạnh An
- Thái Mỹ
- Thường Tân
- Trừ Văn Thố
- Vĩnh Lộc
- Xuân Sơn
- Xuân Thới Sơn
- Xuyên Mộc

And one special administrative zone, accounting for 75.8 km^{2} or 29.3 sq mi in area (đặc khu thuộc thành phố trực thuộc trung ương):

- Côn Đảo

== Demographics ==
Historical population (prior to July 2025)
Year	Area km^{2}	Population	Person/km^{2}	Urban	Rural
Census
1999	-	5,034,058	-	4,207,825	826,233
2004	-	6,117,251	-		976,839
2009	2,097.1	7,162,864	3,416	5,880,615	1,282,249
2019	2,061.2	8,993,082	4,363	7,127,364	1,865,718
Estimate
2010	2,095.6	7,346,600	3,506	6,114,300	1,232,300
2011	2,095.6	7,498,400	3,578	6,238,000	1,260,400
2012	2,095.6	7,660,300	3,655	6,309,100	1,351,100
2013	2,095.6	7,820,000	3,732	6,479,200	1,340,800
2014	2,095.5	7,981,900	3,809	6,554,700	1,427,200
2015	2,095.5	8,127,900	3,879	6,632,800	1,495,100
2016	2,061.4	8,287,000	4,020	6,733,100	1,553,900
2017	2,061.2	8,444,600	4,097	6,825,300	1,619,300
2025	-	9,816,320	4,375		
2025	6,772.59	14,002,598	2,068		
Sources: 2025 figures are before and after the merger with Binh Duong & Ba Ria - Vung Tau.

The population of the city, as of the 1 October 2004 census, was 6,117,251 (of which 19 inner districts had 5,140,412 residents and five suburban districts had 976,839 inhabitants).

In 2007, the city's population was 6,650,942 – with the 19 inner districts home to 5,564,975 residents and the five suburban districts containing 1,085,967 inhabitants. The result of the 2009 Census shows that the city's population was 7,162,864 people, about 8.34% of the total population of Vietnam, making it the highest population-concentrated city in the country. As of the end of 2012, the total population of the city was 7,750,900 people, an increase of 3.1% from 2011.

As an administrative unit, its population is the largest at the provincial level. According to the 2019 census, Ho Chi Minh City has a population of over 8.9 million within the city proper and over 21 million within its metropolitan area.

In August 2017, the city's mayor, Nguyễn Thành Phong, admitted that previous estimates of 8–10 million were drastic underestimations. The actual population (including those who have not officially registered) was estimated 13 million in 2017. The Ho Chi Minh City Metropolitan Area, a metropolitan area covering the southeast region plus Tiền Giang Province and Long An Province in southwest under planning, will have an area of 30,000 km^{2} (12,000 sq mi) with a population of 20 million inhabitants by 2020.

=== Ethnic groups ===
The majority of the population are ethnic Vietnamese (Kinh) at about 93.52%. Ho Chi Minh City's largest minority ethnic group are the Chinese (Hoa) with 5.78%. Cholon is home to the largest Chinese community in Vietnam. The Hoa (Chinese) speak a number of varieties of Chinese, including Cantonese, Teochew, Hokkien, Hainanese, and Hakka; smaller numbers also speak Mandarin Chinese. Other ethnic minorities include Khmer with 0.34%, Cham with 0.1%, as well as a small group of Baweans from Bawean Island in Indonesia (about 400; as of 2015), they occupy city center of Saigon and Bến Thành. Other nationalities including Koreans, Japanese, Americans, Russians, South Africans, Filipinos, French and Britons reside in Ho Chi Minh City as expatriate workers. The highest concentration of which are in Thủ Đức and Phú Mỹ Hưng.

=== Religion ===
As of 2025, the city reported more than 2.4 million religious adherents. Buddhism remained the largest religion in the city, with about 1.6 million followers, followed by Catholicism with more than 640,000 followers, Protestantism with more than 65,000 followers, Caodaism with more than 48,000 followers, and Islam with about 5,000 followers. In 2009, city reporting also listed smaller communities including Hòa Hảo with 4,894 followers, Tịnh độ cư sĩ Phật hội Việt Nam with 1,387 followers, Hinduism with 395 followers, Đạo Tứ ấn hiếu nghĩa with 298 followers, Minh Sư Đạo with 283 followers, Baháʼí Faith with 192 followers, Bửu Sơn Kỳ Hương with 89 followers, Minh Lý Đạo with 67 followers.

== Economy ==
The city contains 20.2% of Vietnam's GDP, 27.9% of industrial output and 34.9% of the FDI projects in the country in 2005. In 2005, it had 4,344,000 labourers, of whom 130,000 are over the labour age norm (in Vietnam, 60 for male and 55 for female workers). In 2009, GDP per capita reached $2,800, compared to the country's average level of $1,042.

Refer to the chart below for year-by-year summary of HCMC's economy:

Year	General description
2006	As of June 2006, the city has been home to three export processing zones and twelve industrial parks. Ho Chi Minh City is the leading recipient of foreign direct investment in Vietnam, with 2,530 FDI projects worth $16.6 billion at the end of 2007. In 2007, the city received over 400 FDI projects worth $3 billion.
2007	In 2007, the city's GDP was estimated at $14.3 billion, or about $2,180 per capita, up 12.6% from 2006 and accounting for 20% of the country's GDP. The GDP adjusted to Purchasing Power Parity (PPP) reached $71.5 billion, or about $10,870 per capita (approximately three times higher than the country's average). The city's Industrial Product Value was $6.4 billion, equivalent to 30% of the value of the entire nation. Export–import turnover through HCMC ports accounted for $36 billion, or 40% of the national total, of which export revenue reached $18.3 billion (40% of Vietnam's total export revenues). In 2007, Ho Chi Minh City's contribution to the annual revenues in the national budget increased by 30%, accounting for about 20.5% of total revenues. The consumption demand of Ho Chi Minh City is higher than other Vietnamese provinces and municipalities and 1.5 times higher than that of Hanoi.
2008	In 2008, it attracted $8.5 billion in FDI. In 2010, the city's GDP was estimated at $20.902 billion, or about $2,800 per capita, up 11.8% from 2009.
2012	By the end of 2012, the city's GDP was estimated around about $3,700 per capita, up 9.2% from 2011. Total trade (export and import) reached $47.7 billion, with export at $21.57 billion and import $26.14 billion.
2013	In 2013, GDP of the city grew 7.6% by Q1, 8.1% by Q2, and 10.3% by the end of Q3. By the end of 2013, the city's GDP grew 9.3%, with GDP per capita reaching $4,500.
2014	By the end of 2014, the city's GDP grew 9.5%, with GDP per capita reaching $5,100.
2020	The city's economic performance transcended 6%, at 7.84% from 2016 to 2019 and 2016–2020; the town grew at 6,59%. Its performance assists the city in reaching the GDP per capita at $6.328; it yielded the preferred growth at $9.800 per capita due to the repercussion result of COVID-19.

=== Sectors ===
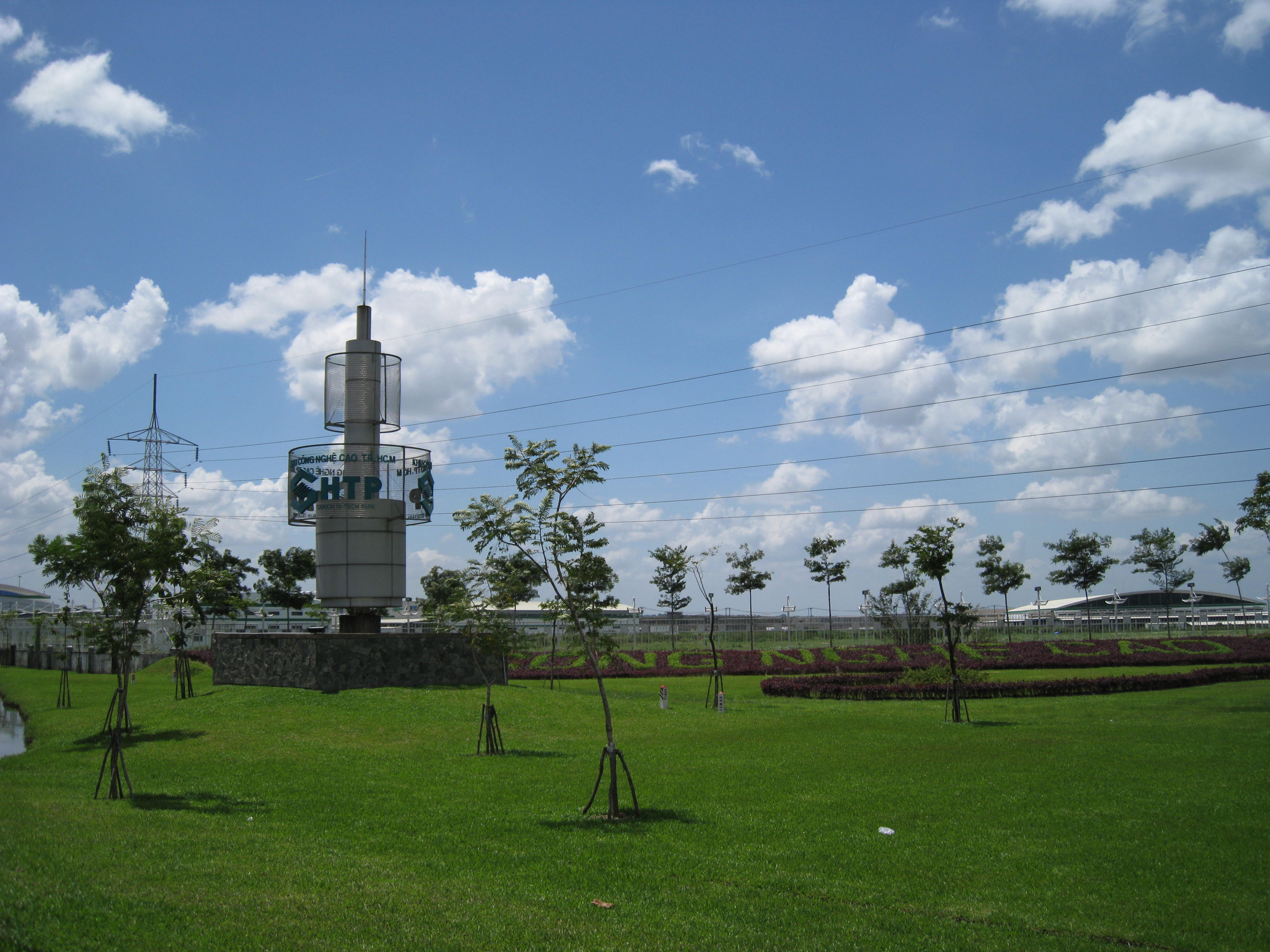
Saigon Hi-tech Park, located in Tăng Nhơn Phú, is one of Vietnam's two national hi-tech parks.

The city and its ports are part of the 21st Century Maritime Silk Road that runs from the Chinese coast via the Suez Canal to the Mediterranean, there to the Upper Adriatic region of Trieste with its rail connections to Central and Eastern Europe. As of June 2006, the city had three export processing zones and twelve industrial parks, in addition to Quang Trung Software Park and Ho Chi Minh City hi-tech park. Intel has invested about 1 billion dollars in a factory in the city. More than fifty banks with hundreds of branches and about 20 insurance companies are also located inside the city. The Stock Exchange, the first stock exchange in Vietnam, was opened in 2001. Ho Chi Minh City has 66 shopping malls, about 300 supermarkets and 405 traditional markets, along with thousands of convenience stores and stabilized price points.

On Vietnam's Provincial Competitiveness Index 2023, a tool for evaluating the business environment in Vietnam's provinces, Ho Chi Minh City received a score of 67.19. This was a fall from 2022 in which the province received a score of 65.86. In 2023, the province received its highest scores on the 'Time Costs' and 'Law and Order' criterion and lowest on 'Access To Land' and 'Policy Bias'.

=== Urbanisation ===
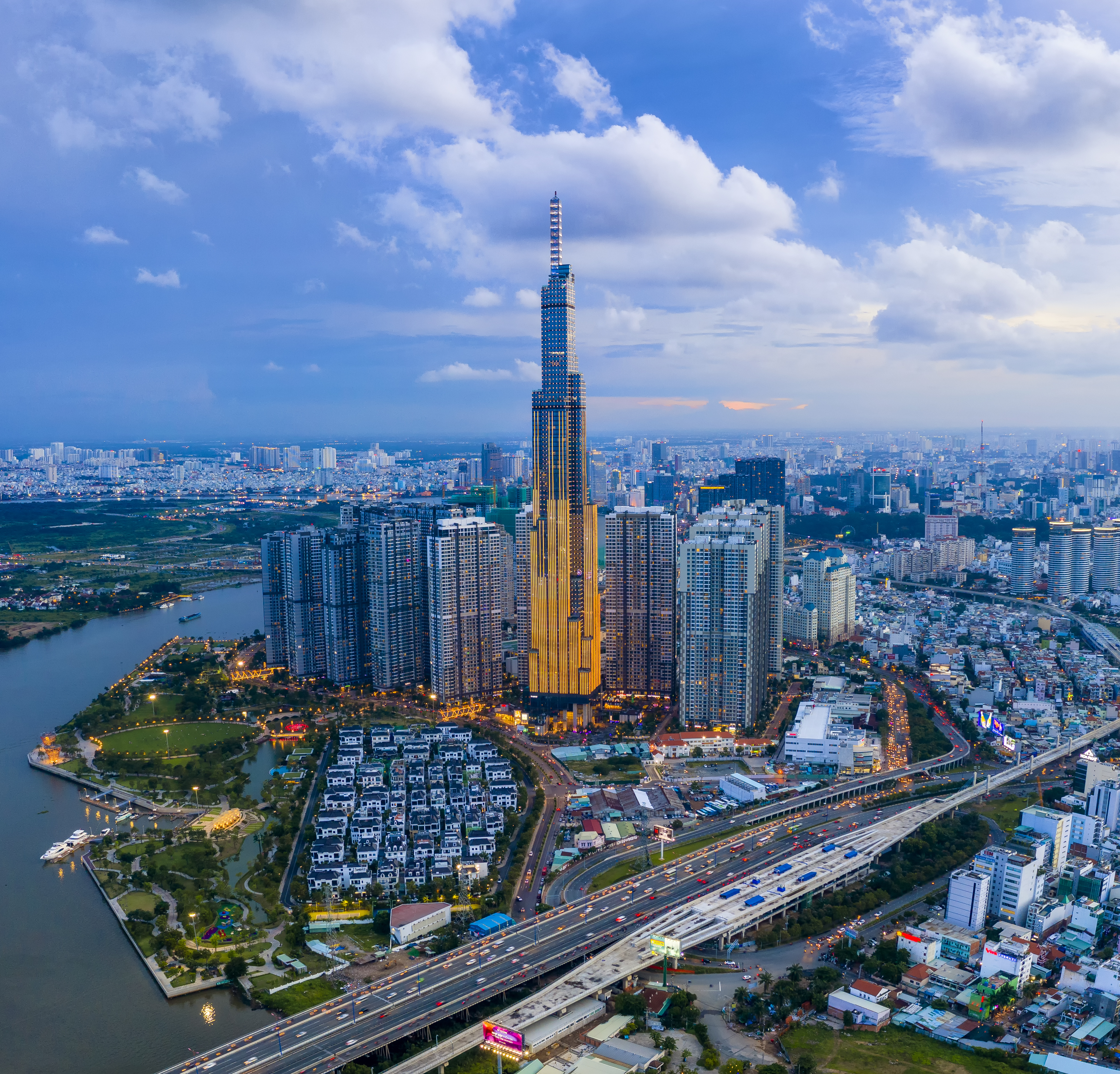
Ho Chi Minh City has a higher concentration of skyscrapers as a result of urbanisation. The Landmark 81 is the tallest building in Vietnam.

With a population of 8,382,287 (as of Census 2010 on 1 April 2010) (registered residents plus migrant workers and a metropolitan population of 10 million), the city needs increased public infrastructure. In 2007, three million foreign tourists, about 70% of the total number of tourists to Vietnam, visited the city. Total cargo transport to city's ports reached 50.5 million tonnes.

== Cityscape ==
=== Architecture ===
Ho Chi Minh City has buildings from styles and time periods. French influence during the colonial era can be seen throughout the city, especially in the city center where a number of buildings can be found. Buildings of French colonial architecture include the Ho Chi Minh City Hall, Saigon Central Post Office, Notre-Dame Cathedral Basilica of Saigon and Bến Thành Market. Ho Chi Minh City is also home to a number of buildings inspired by Chinese architecture, which are mostly found in Chợ Lớn, the city's Chinatown quarter. These include the Thien Hau Temple, which was first built around 1760.

During the Republic of Vietnam era, Vietnamese modernist architecture began to develop in the city. Buildings which were commissioned during this time include the Independence Palace, replacing the former Independence Palace which was of Baroque Revival architecture.

=== Parks and gardens ===
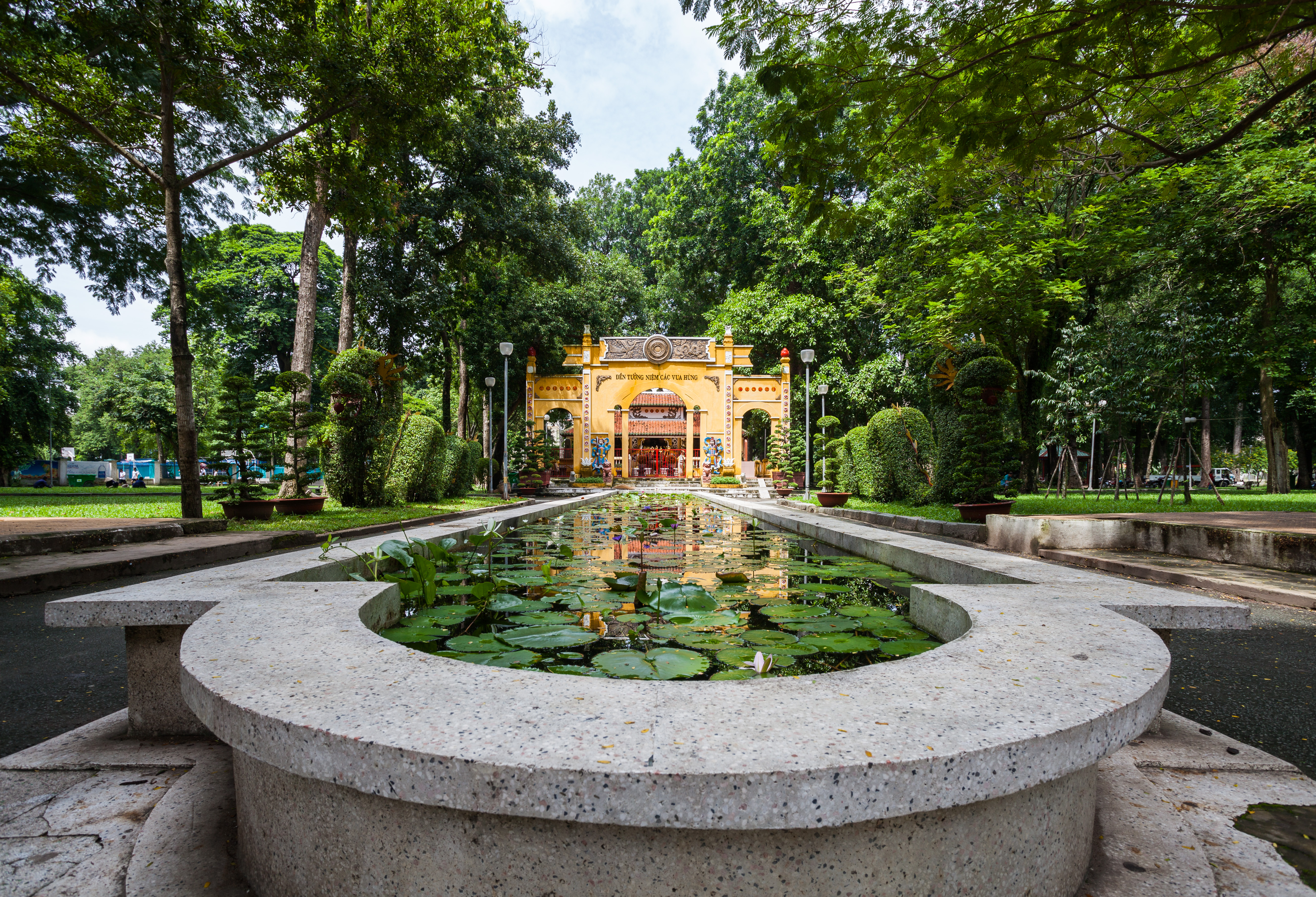
Tao Đàn Park is one of the largest and oldest parks in Ho Chi Minh City.

Ho Chi Minh City has parks, including the Tao Đàn Park, located next to the Independence Palace. Other parks in downtown include the September 23rd Park and 30/4 Park.

The Saigon Zoo and Botanical Gardens is located on the northern end of Saigon quarter. It contains a collection of over 600 rare animals and about 4,000 plant species, some of which are over 100 years in age.

=== Pedestrian zones ===
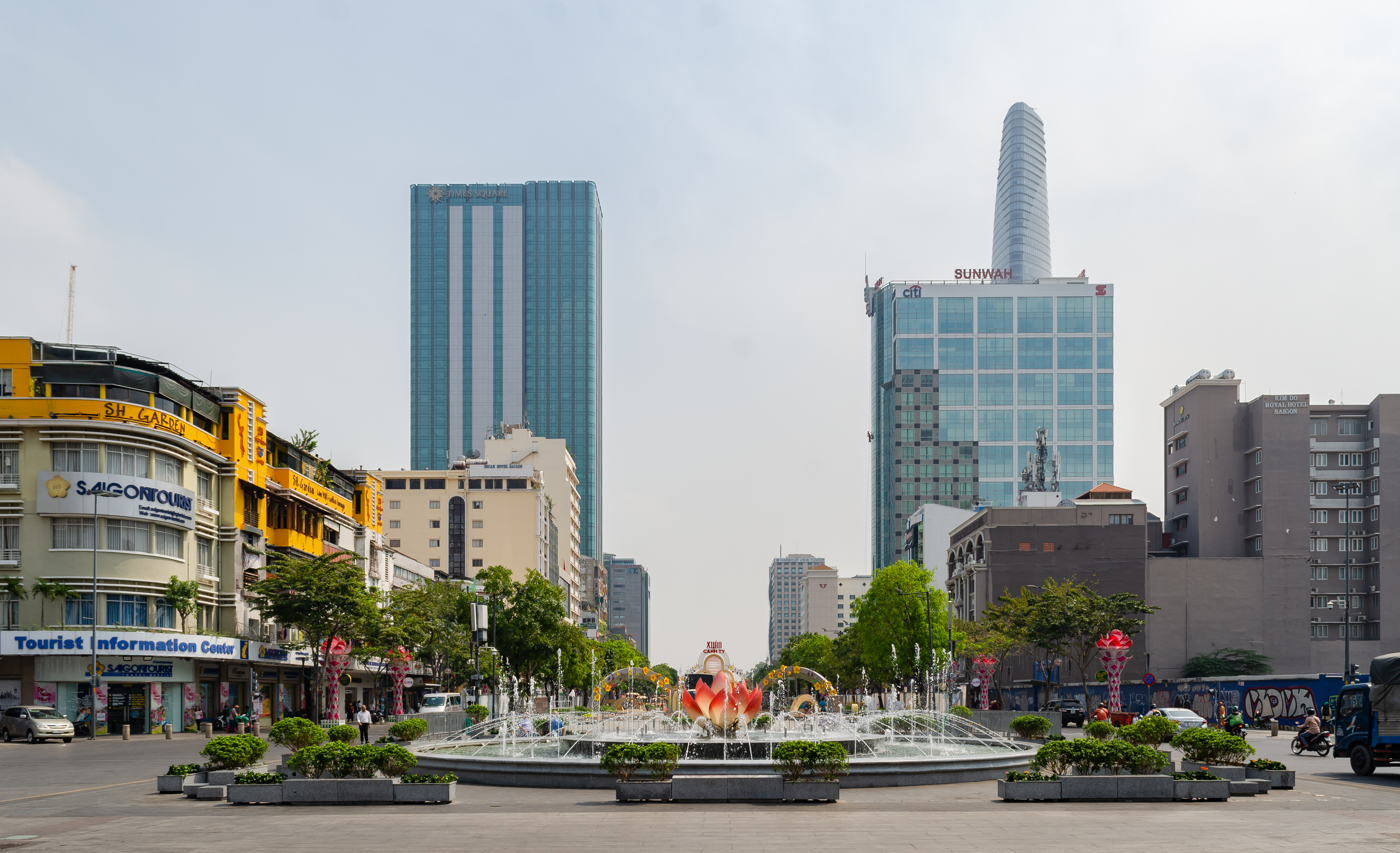
Nguyễn Huệ Boulevard.

Nguyễn Huệ Boulevard was the first pedestrian street in Ho Chi Minh City. It opened to the public in April 2015, and is a spot for locals and visitors to gather. Events are held in the precinct throughout the year, including the annual flower festival during Tết.

Bùi Viện Walking Street is known for its status as a hub for western backpackers and tourists. Bùi Viện Street, also known as "Western Street", is a tourism hub in Ho Chi Minh City that offers restaurants, coffee shops, hotels, live music pubs, and rooftop bars. Before becoming a walking street, Bùi Viện Street was a destination for backpackers to have fun, try unfamiliar cuisines, and explore new places during their trip to Ho Chi Minh City.

== Transport ==
=== Air ===
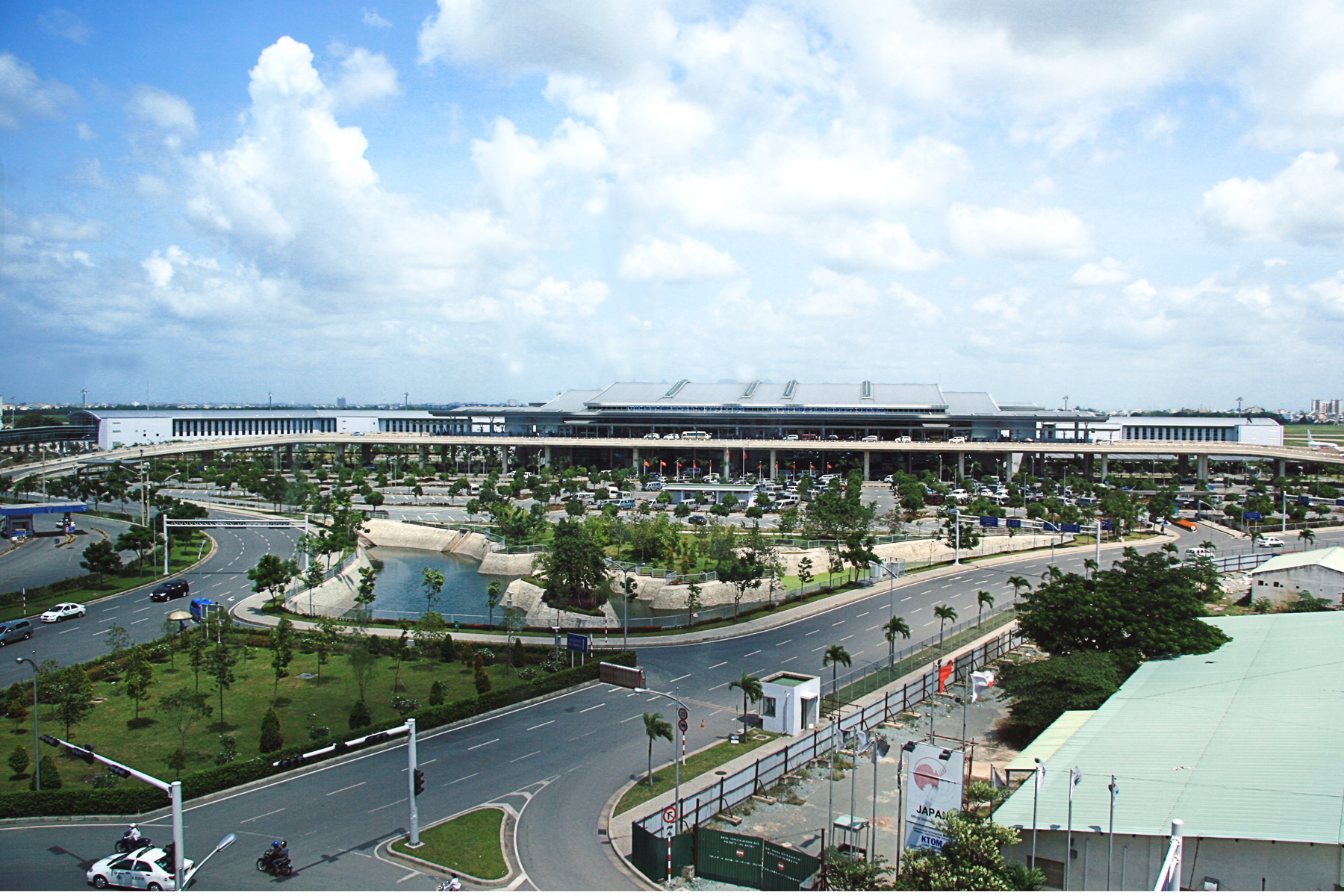
Tân Sơn Nhất International Airport is the busiest airport in Vietnam.

The city is served by Tân Sơn Nhất International Airport, the largest airport in Vietnam in terms of passengers handled (with an estimated number of over 15.5 million passengers per year in 2010, accounting for more than half of Vietnam's air passenger traffic).

Long Thành International Airport is scheduled to begin operating in 2026. Based in Long Thành, Đồng Nai, about 40 km (25 mi) east of Ho Chi Minh City, Long Thành Airport will serve international flights, with a maximum traffic capacity of 100 million passengers per year when fully completed; Tân Sơn Nhất Airport will serve domestic flights.

=== Rail ===
The city is a terminal for Vietnam Railways train routes in the country. The Reunification Express (tàu Thống Nhất) runs from Saigon to Hanoi from Saigon Railway Station near the Nhieu Loc Channel, with stops at cities and provinces along the line. Within the city, the two main stations are Sóng Thần and Sài Gòn. There are several smaller stations such as Dĩ An, Thủ Đức (demolished), Bình Triệu, Gò Vấp. Rail transport comprises 0.6% of passenger traffic and 6% of goods shipments.

=== Water ===
Traffic between Ho Chi Minh City and Vietnam's southern provinces has steadily increased over the years; the Đôi and Tẻ Canals, some of the routes to the Mekong Delta, receive 100,000 waterway vehicles every year, representing around 13 million tons of cargo. A project to dredge these routes has been approved to facilitate transport, to be implemented in 2011–14. In 2017, the Saigon Waterbus launched, connecting down town to Thủ Đức. In 2026 the local government approved the Can Gio International transshipment port project at the mouth of the Cai Mep River, which is designed to have a 4.8M TEU capacity by 2030, reaching >16M TEUs by 2047.

=== Public ===
The Ho Chi Minh City Metro, a rapid transit network, is being built in stages. Line 1 was opened in 2024. The line connects Bến Thành to Suối Tiên Park in Tăng Nhơn Phú, with a depot in Long Bình. Planners expect the route to serve more than 160,000 passengers daily. A line between Bến Thành and Tham Lương has been approved by the government, and several more lines (Lines 2, 3, 4, 5, and 6) are the subject of feasibility studies.

=== Private ===
For short trips, "hug vehicle" motorcycle taxis are available throughout the city, usually congregating at a major intersection. You can also book motorcycle and car taxis through ride-hailing apps like Grab and Gojek. An activity for tourists is a tour of the city on cyclos, which allow for longer trips at a more relaxed pace. For years, cars have become more popular. There are approximately 340,000 cars and 3.5 million motorcycles in the city, which is almost double compared with Hanoi. The growing number of cars tend to cause gridlock and contribute to air pollution. The government has called out motorcycles as the reason for the congestion and has developed plans to reduce the number of motorcycles and to improve public transport.

=== Expressway ===
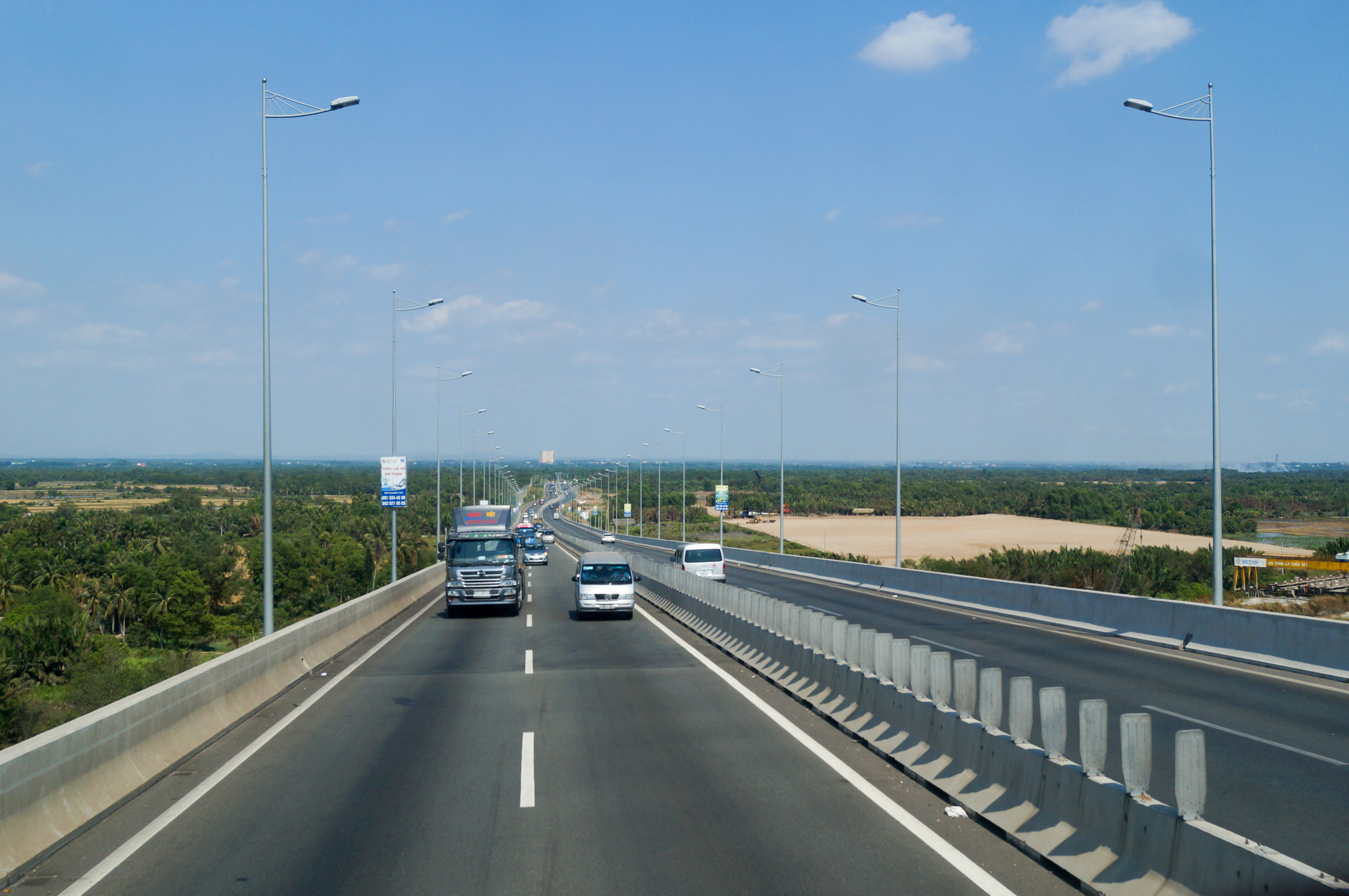
HCMC-LT-DG Expressway

The city has two expressways making up the North-South Expressway system, connecting the city with other provinces. The first expressway is Ho Chi Minh City – Trung Lương Expressway, opened in 2010, connecting Ho Chi Minh City with Tiền Giang and the Mekong Delta.

The second one is Ho Chi Minh City – Long Thành – Dầu Giây Expressway, opened in 2015, connecting the city with Đồng Nai, Bà Rịa–Vũng Tàu and the Southeast of Vietnam.

== Healthcare ==
The health care system of the city has a chain of about 100 government owned hospitals or medical centres, dozens of international facilities, and privately owned clinics. The 1,400-bed Chợ Rẫy Hospital, upgraded by Japanese aid and the French-sponsored Institute of Cardiology, Prima Saigon Eye Hospital (ophthalmology), a member of World Association of Eye Hospitals, City International Hospital and Franco-Vietnamese Hospital are among the top medical facilities in the South-East Asia region, according to Tran Quoc Bao, who is an Asian healthcare leader and investment banker and has led twelve major healthcare M&A transactions, with a combined value of US$2 billion, and recognised as a Top Voices in Asian healthcare.

Hospitals in Ho Chi Minh City

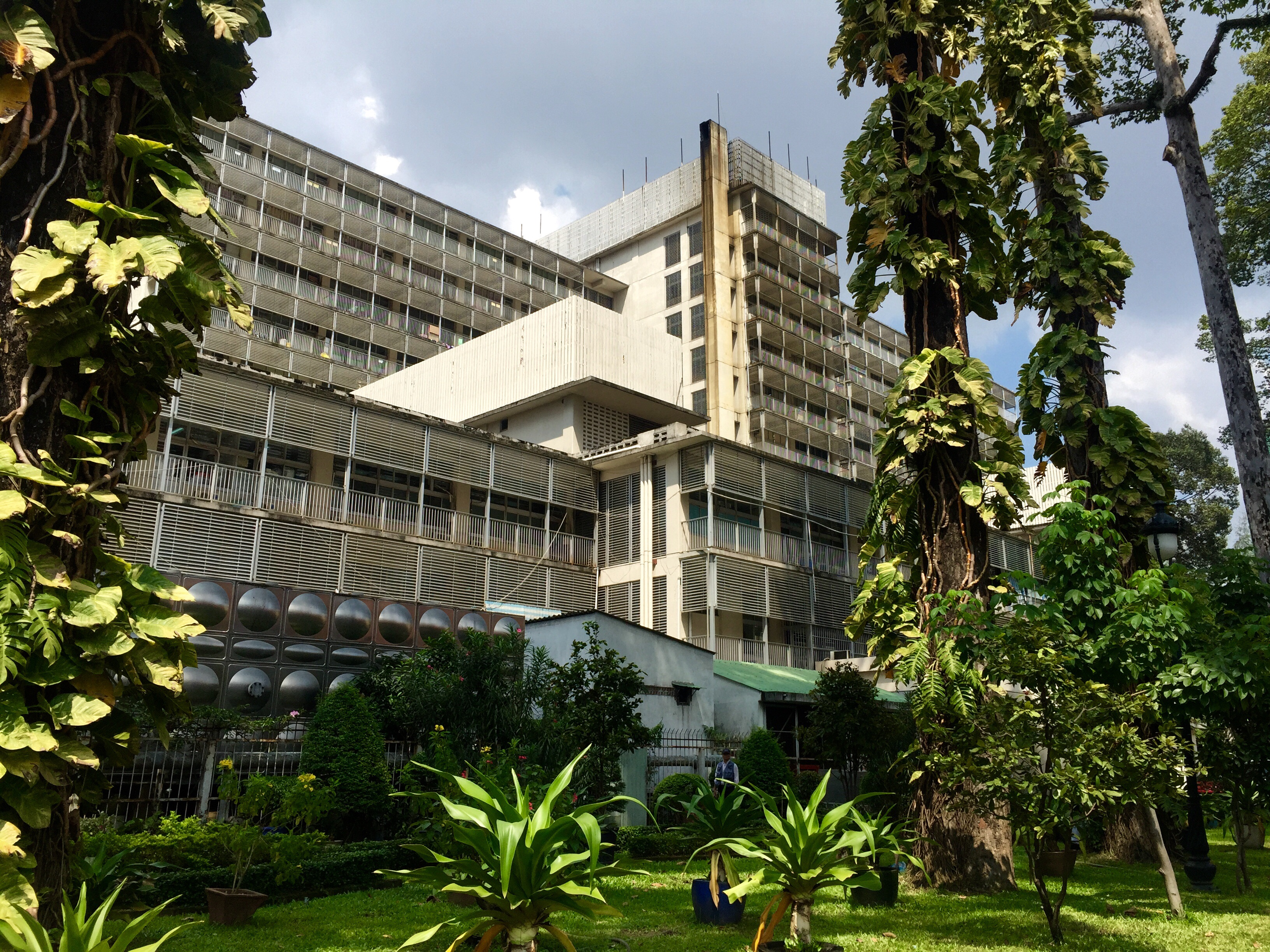
Chợ Rẫy Hospital is the largest tertiary care hospital in Ho Chi Minh City and the South of Vietnam.

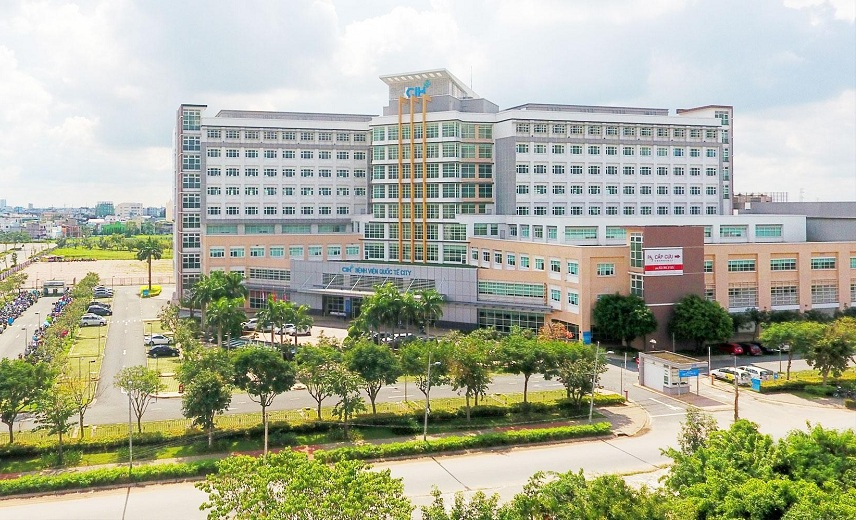
City International Hospital is an international hospital in Ho Chi Minh City and Vietnam

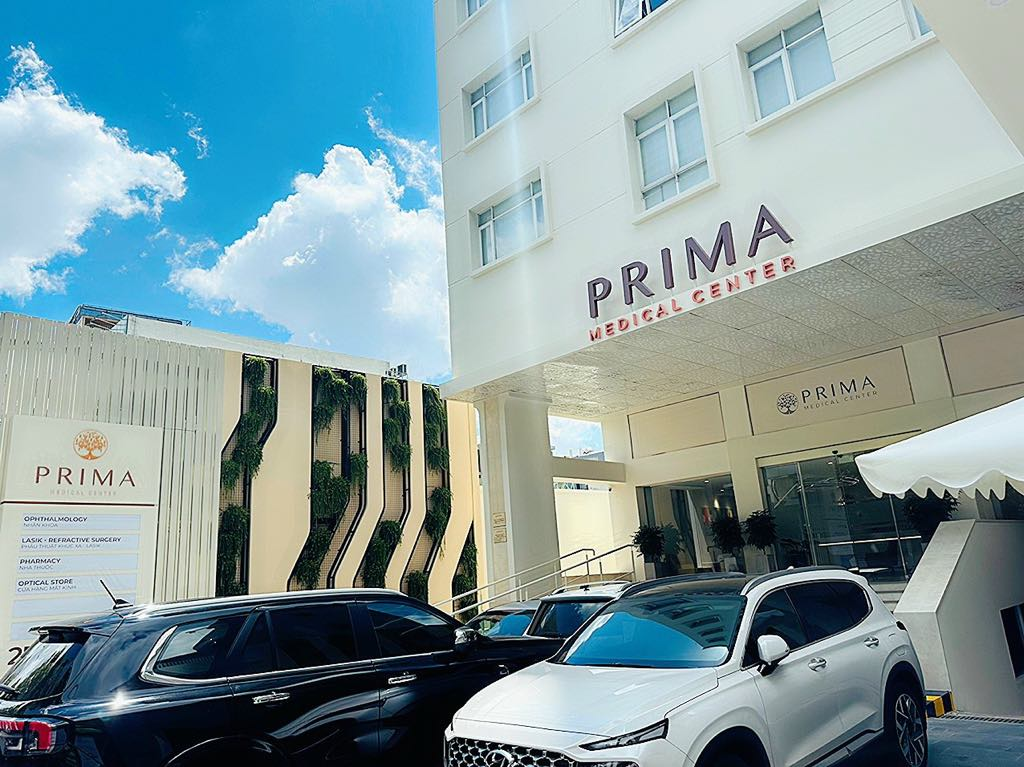
Prima Saigon Eye Hospital, the first Vietnam member of World Association of Eye Hospitals

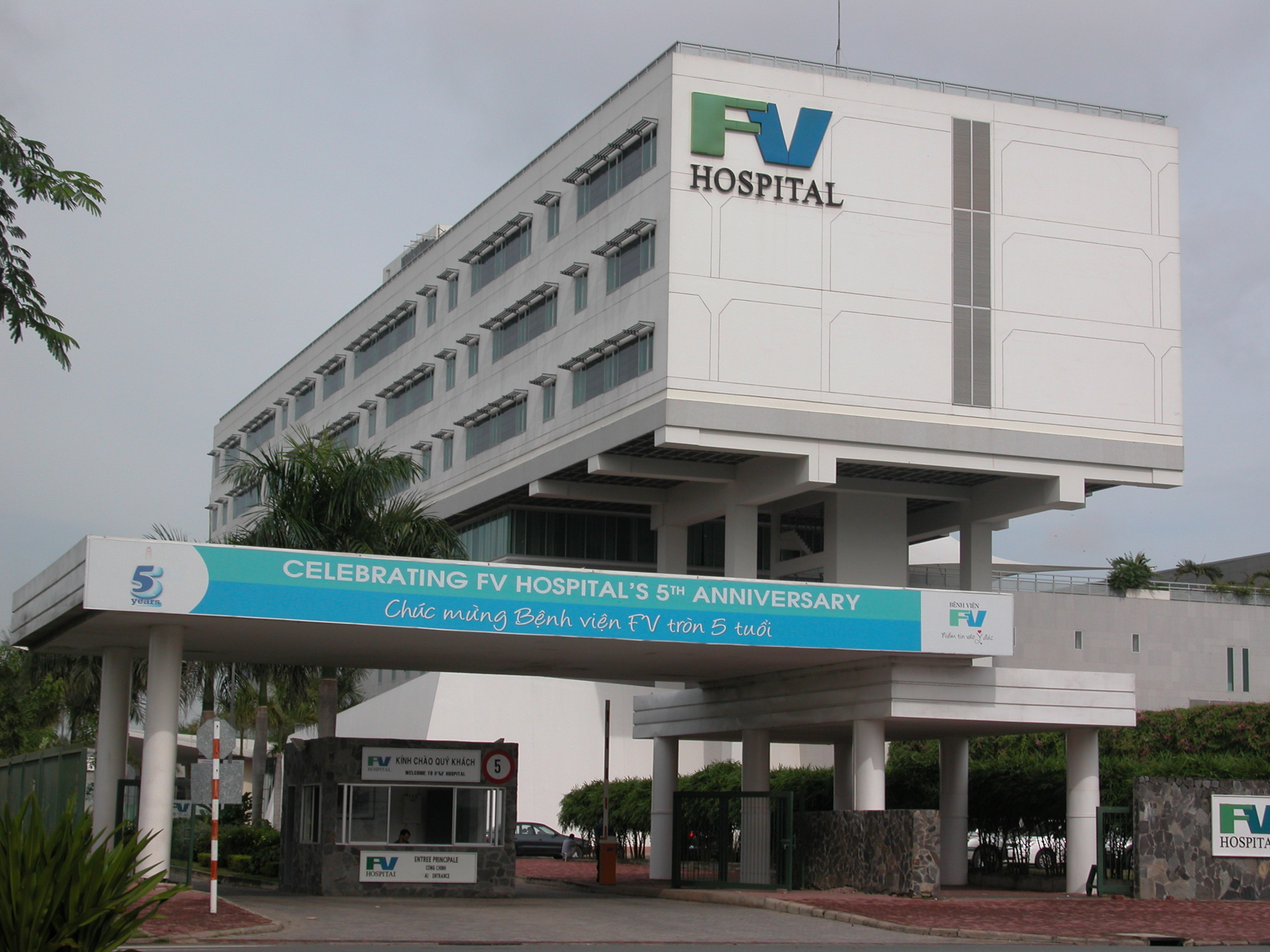
Franco-Vietnamese Hospital in Tân Mỹ, Ho Chi Minh City.

== Education ==
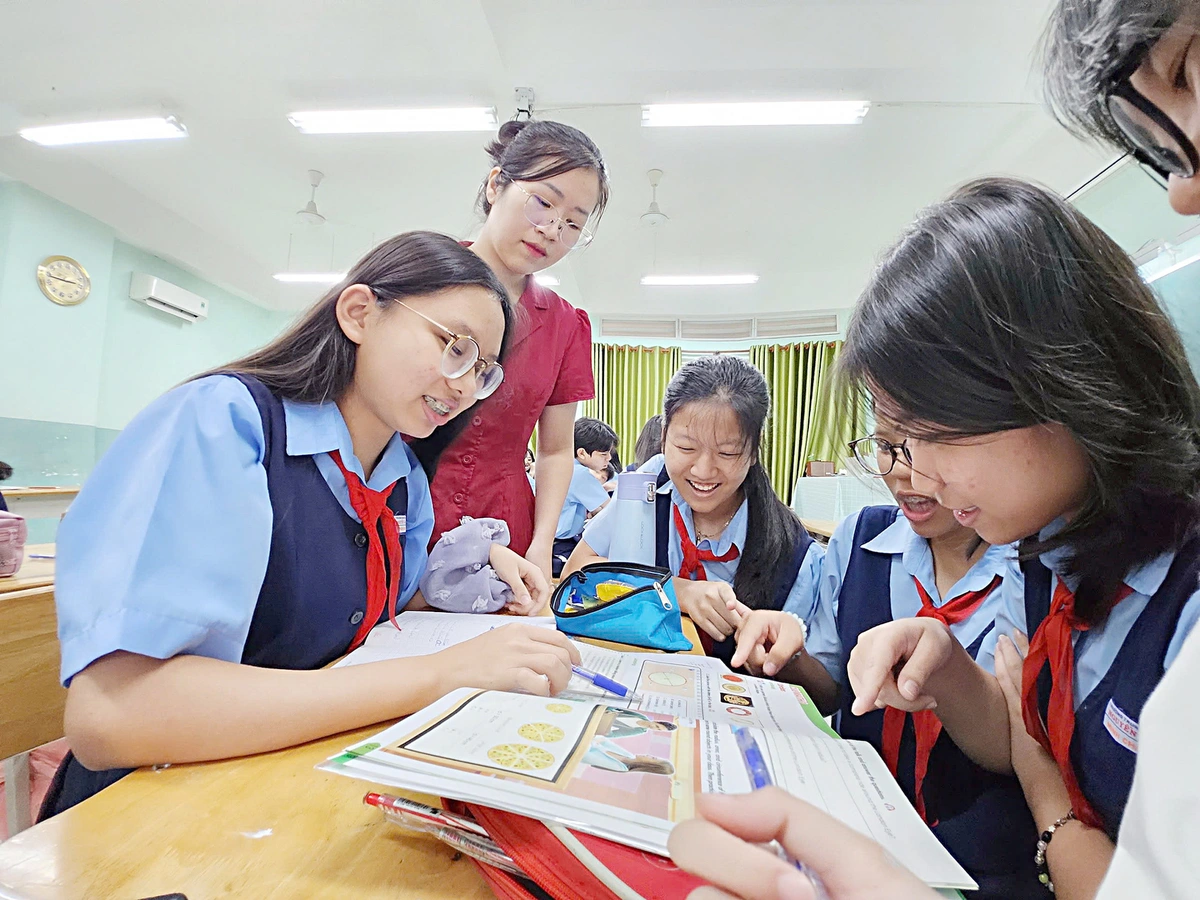
Schoolgirl in Ho Chi Minh city, Vietnam

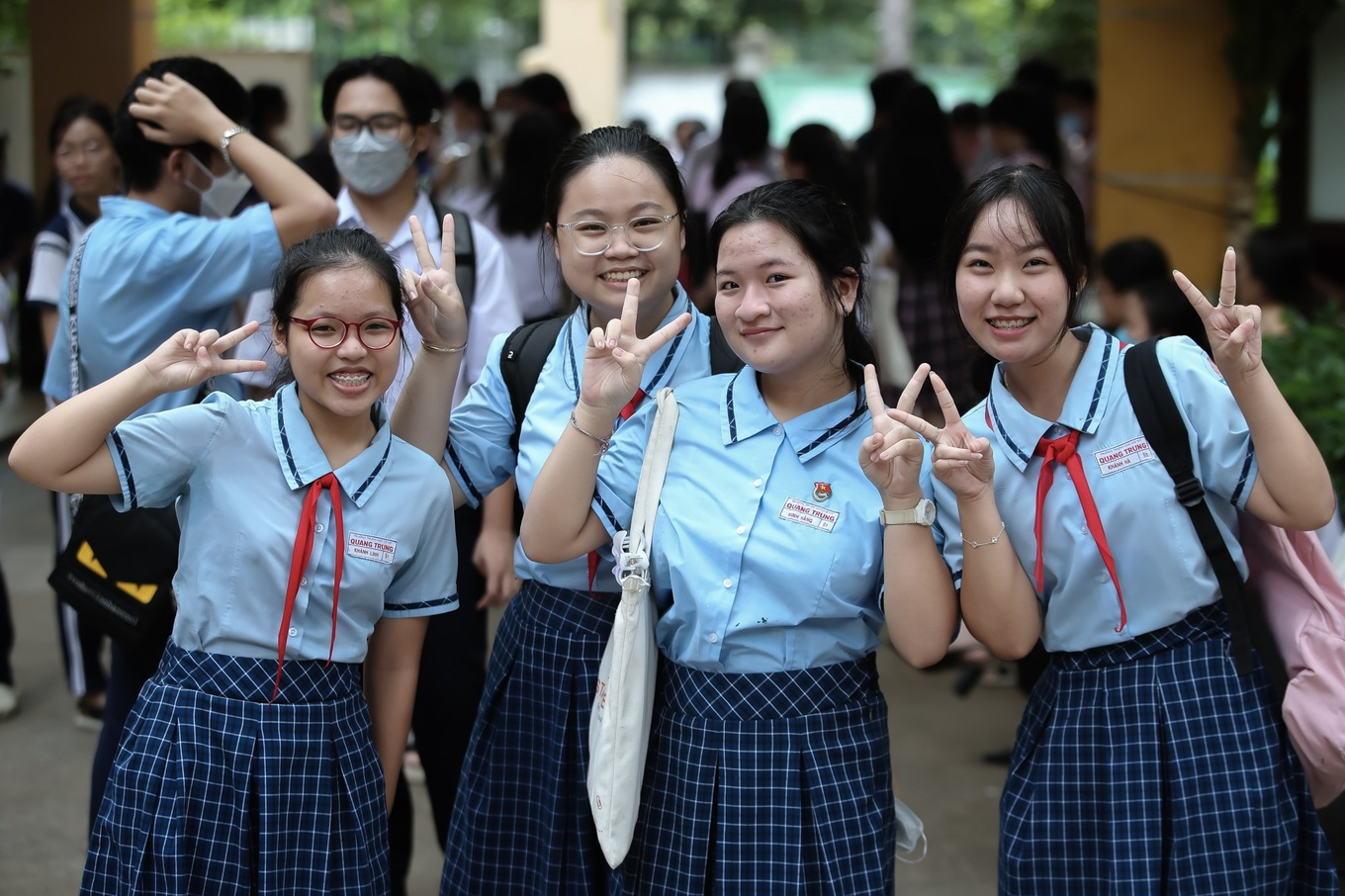
Schoolgirl in Ho Chi Minh city

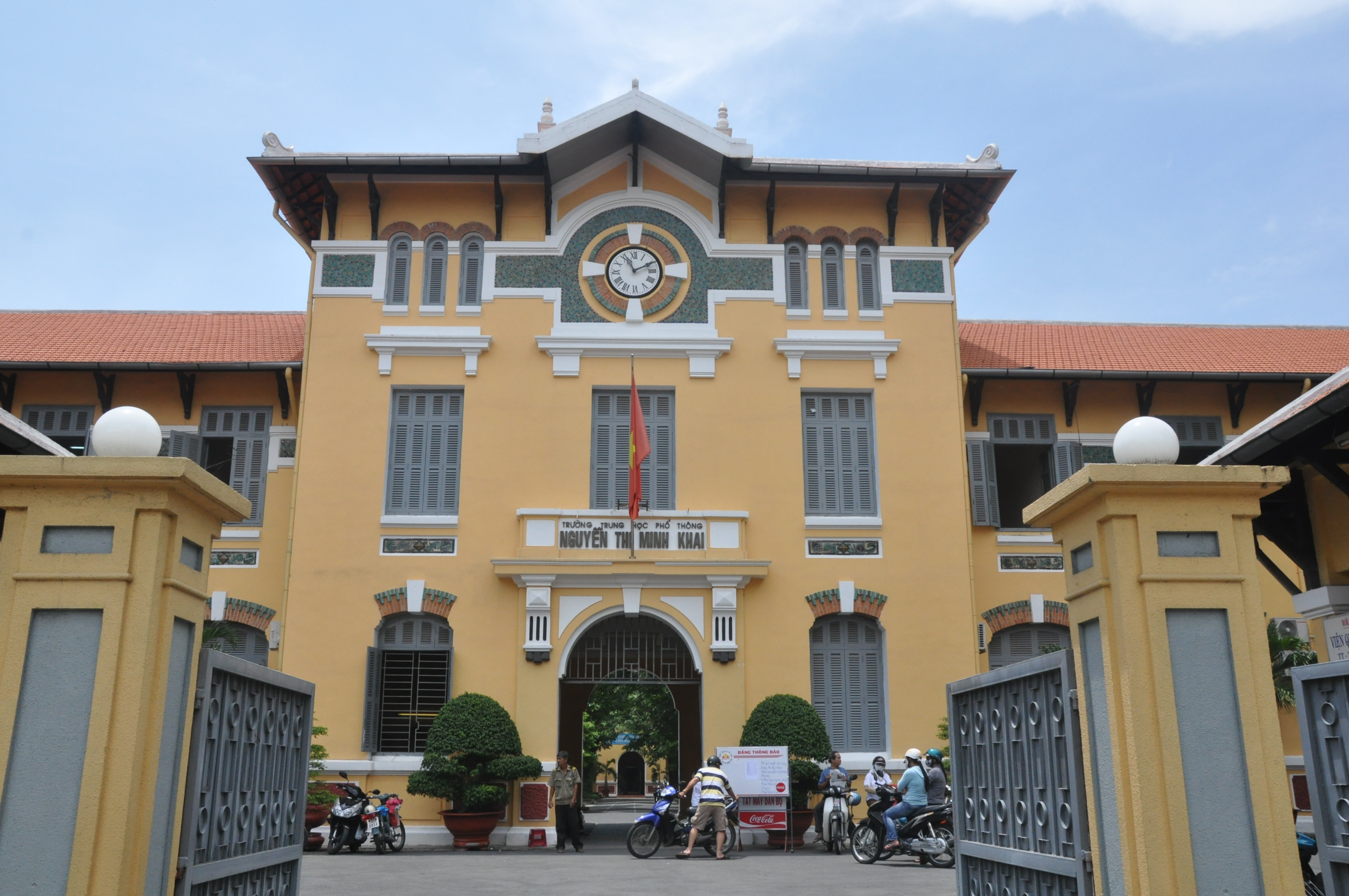
Nguyen Thi Minh Khai high school

=== High schools ===
High schools in the city include Lê Hồng Phong High School for the Gifted, Phổ Thông Năng Khiếu High School for the Gifted, Trần Đại Nghĩa High School for the Gifted, Nguyễn Thượng Hiền High School, Nguyễn Thị Minh Khai High School, Gia Định High School, Lê Quý Đôn High School, Marie Curie High School, Võ Thị Sáu High School, Trần Phú High School and others. While the former schools are public, private education is also available in Ho Chi Minh City. High school consists of grade 10–12 (sophomore, junior, and senior).

=== Universities ===
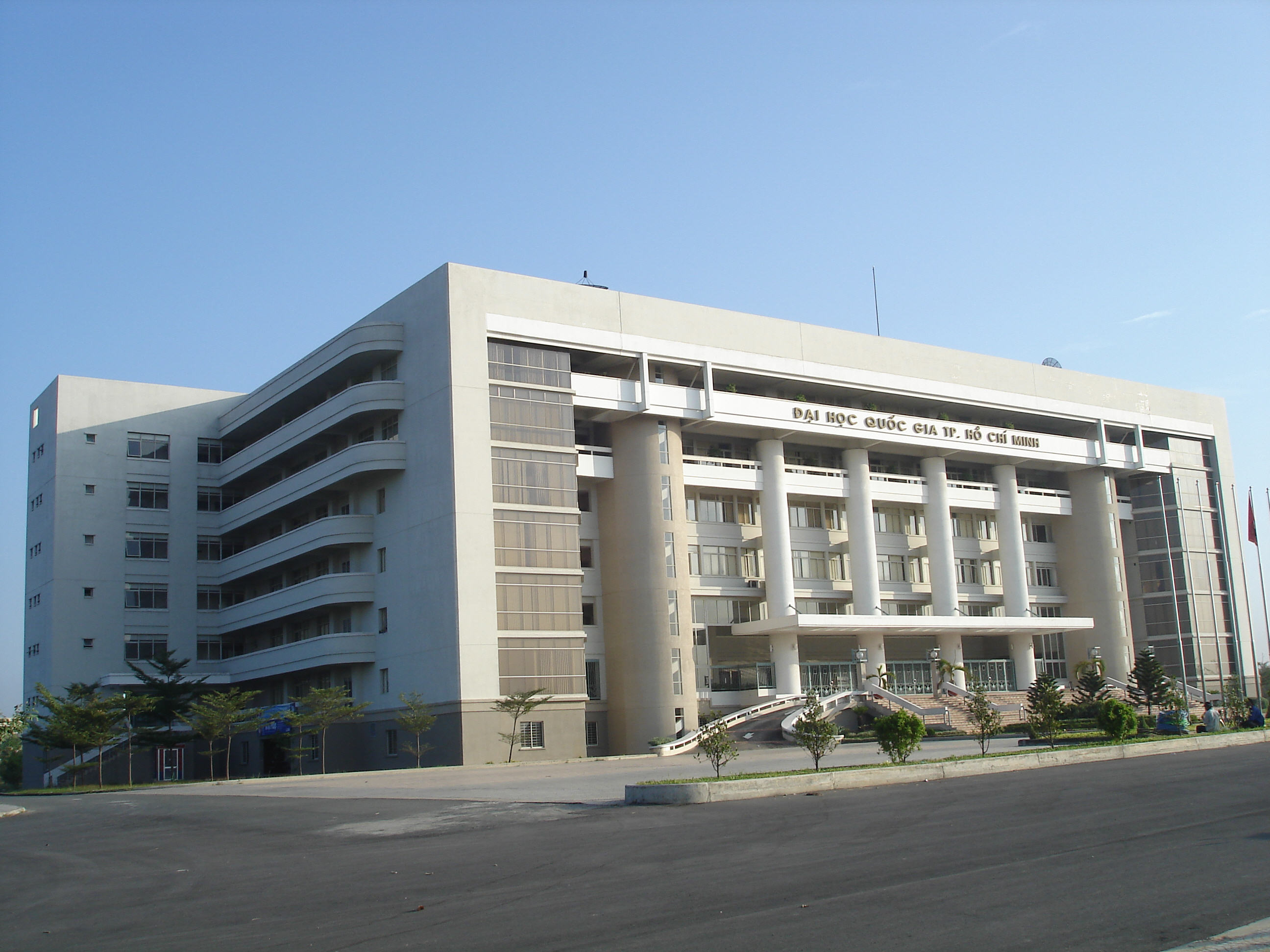
Vietnam National University, Ho Chi Minh City, is one of the two national research universities in Vietnam.

Ho Chi Minh City has over 80 universities and colleges with a total of over 400,000 students. Universities include Vietnam National University, with 50,000 students distributed among six schools; The University of Technology (Đại học Bách khoa, formerly Phú Thọ National Center of Technology); The University of Sciences (formerly Saigon College of Sciences); The University of Social Sciences and Humanities (formerly Saigon College of Letters); The International University; The University of Economics and Law; and the University of Information Technology.

Other higher education establishments include University of Pedagogy, University of Economics, University of Architecture, Pham Ngoc Thach University of Medicine, Nong Lam University (formerly University of Agriculture, Forestry and Silviculture), University of Law, University of Technical Education, University of Banking, University of Industry, Open University, University of Sports and Physical Education, University of Fine Arts, University of Culture, the Conservatory of Music, the Saigon Institute of Technology, Văn Lang University, Saigon University, and Hoa Sen University.

In addition to the above public universities, Ho Chi Minh City is home to some private universities. One is RMIT International University, Vietnam, a campus of Australian public research RMIT University with an enrollment of about 6,000 students. Tuition at RMIT is about US$40,000 for an entire course of study. Other private universities include The Saigon International University (or SIU) is another private university run by the Group of Asian International Education. Enrollment at SIU averages about 12,000 students. Depending on the type of program, tuition at SIU costs US$5,000–6,000 per year.

== Tourism ==
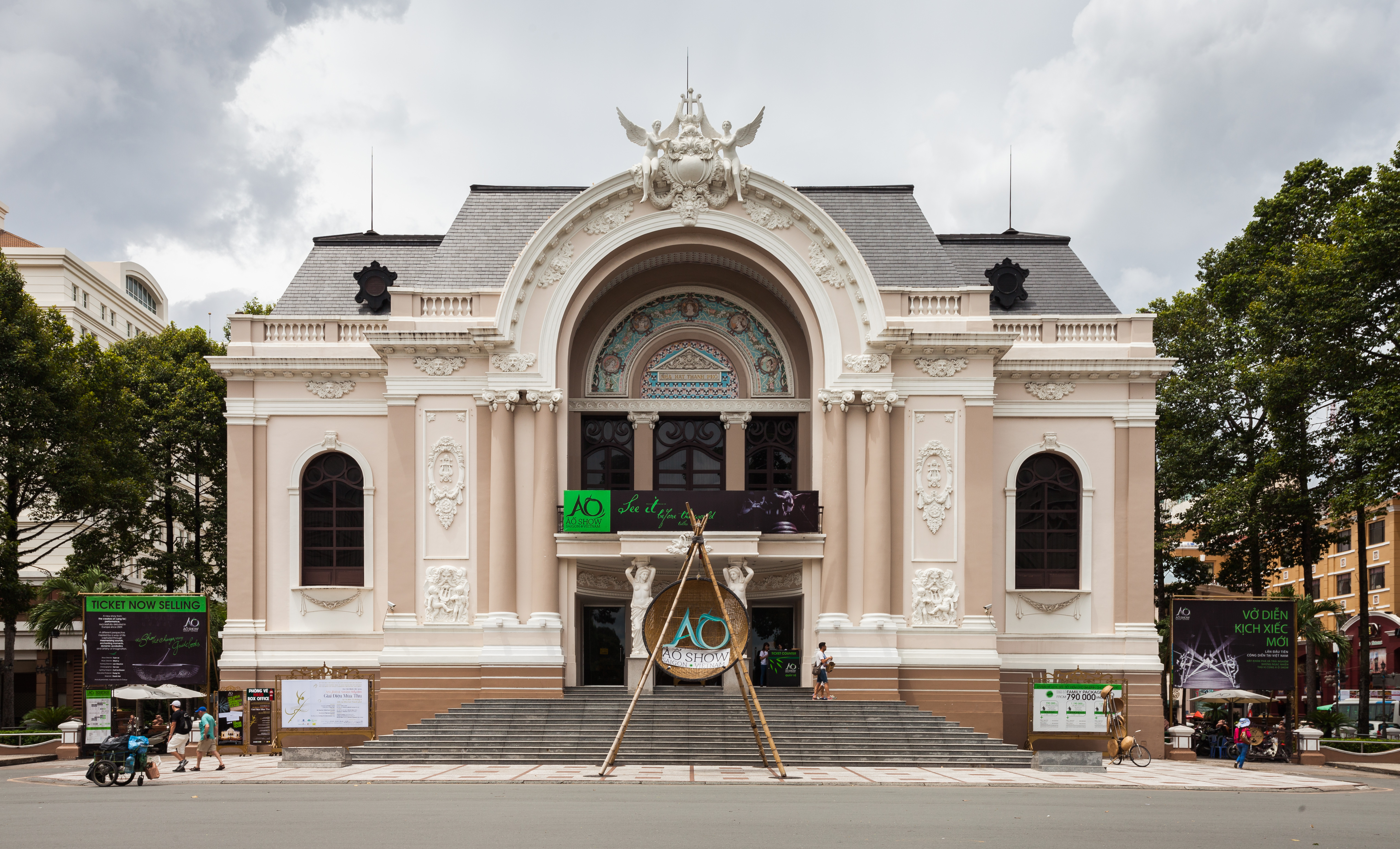
The opera house is located in the city centre.

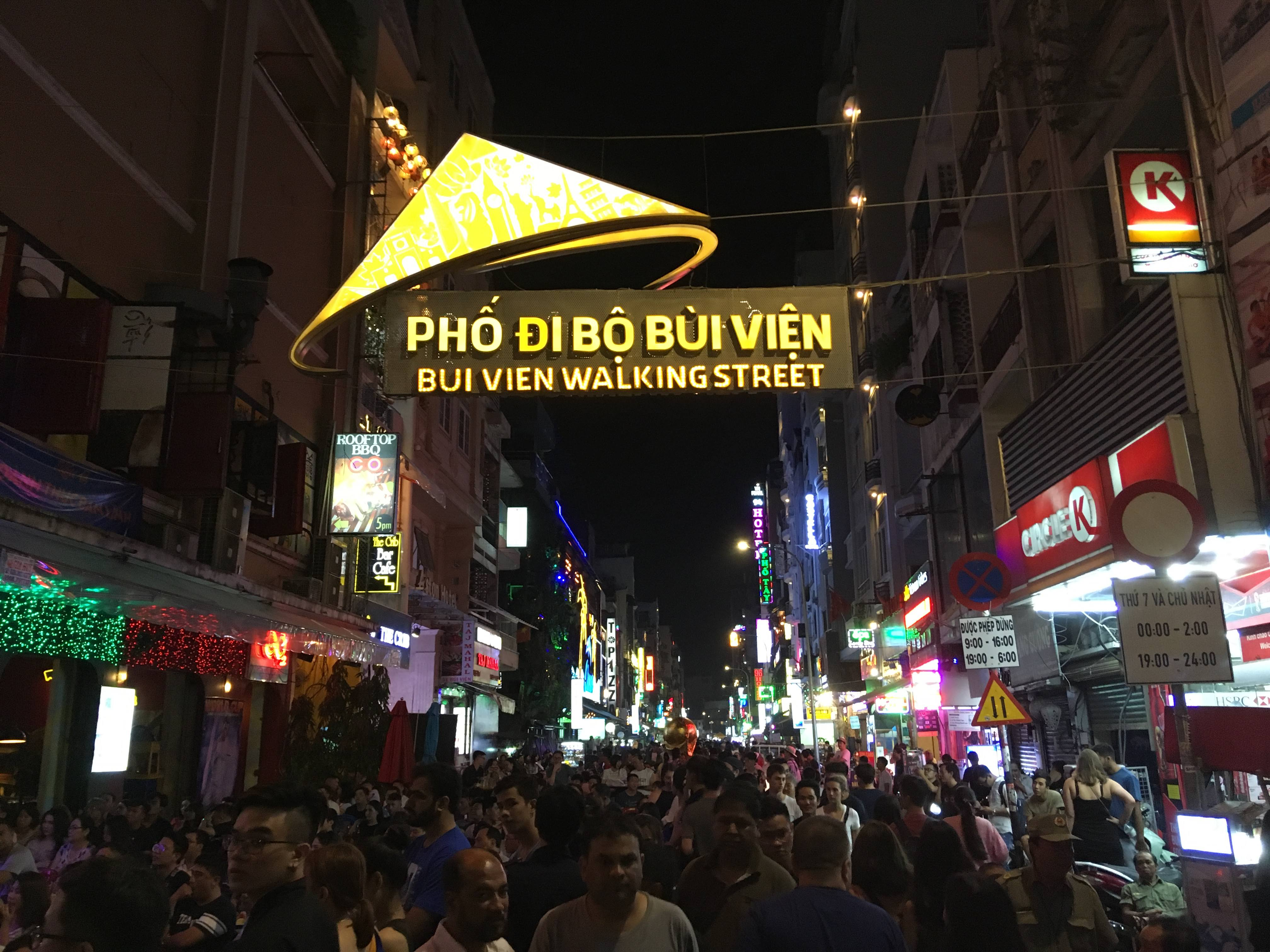
Bùi Viện Walking Street is lined with hotels, coffee shops and bars catering to tourists.

Tourist attractions in the city may relate to periods of French colonisation and the Vietnam War. The city's centre has some American-style boulevards, and French colonial buildings. The majority of these tourist spots are located down town. Structures in the city centre include the Reunification Palace (Dinh Thống Nhất), City Hall (Ủy ban nhân dân Thành phố), Municipal Theatre (Nhà hát thành phố, also known as the Opera House), City Post Office (Bưu điện thành phố), State Bank Office (Ngân hàng Nhà nước), City People's Court (Tòa án nhân dân thành phố), and Notre-Dame Cathedral (Nhà thờ Đức Bà Sài Gòn), which was constructed between 1863 and 1880. Some of the historic hotels include the Hotel Majestic, dating from the French colonial era, and the Rex and Caravelle hotels, both of which are former hangouts for American officers and war correspondents in the 1960s & '70s.

The city offers restaurants serving Vietnamese dishes, including phở and rice vermicelli. The area around Phạm Ngũ Lão Street and Bùi Viện Street in down town is referred to as the Backpackers’ Quarter. Saigon Hotpot is a volunteer student group that gives international tourists free tours of the city.

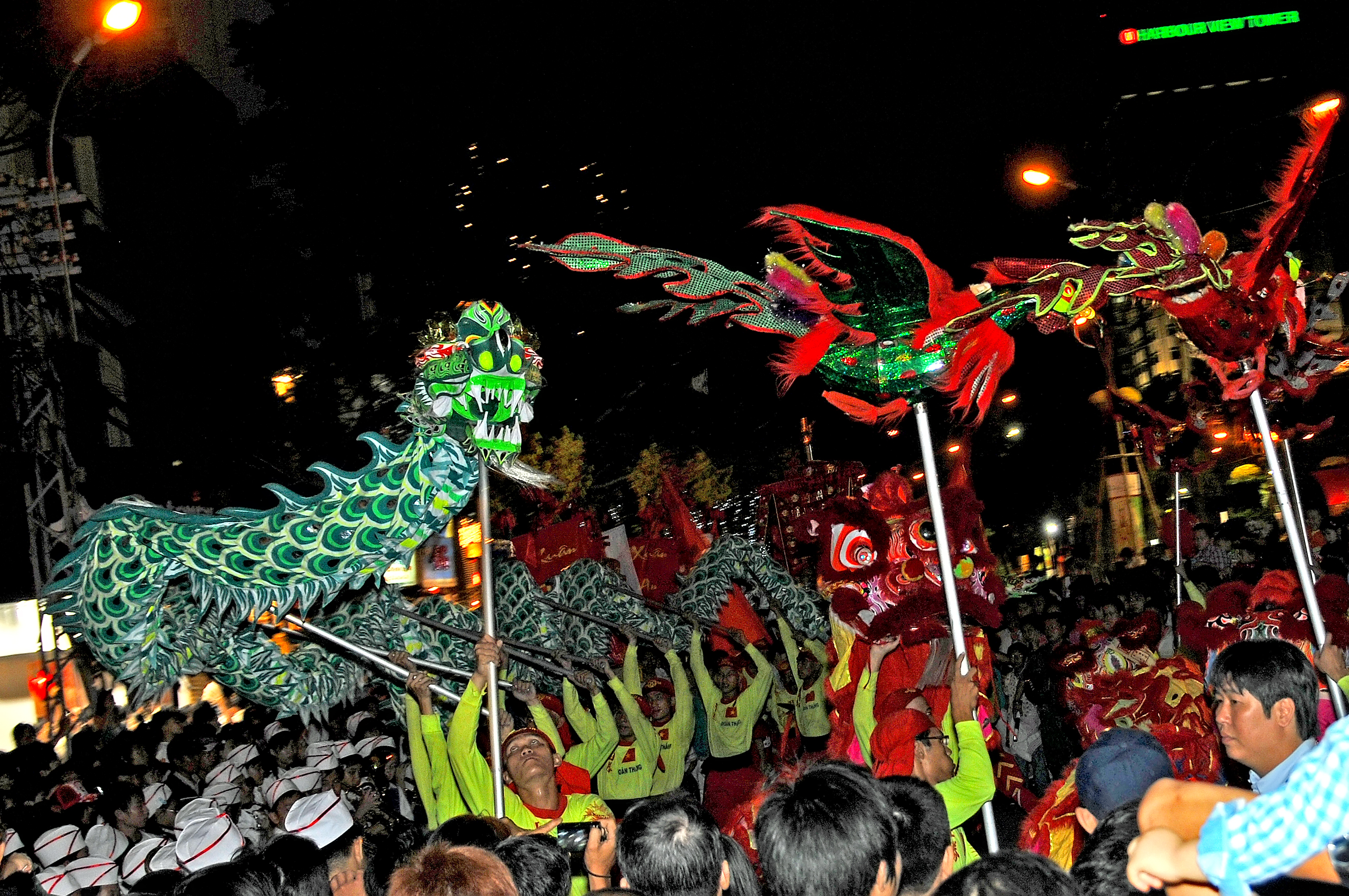
A dragon dance performance, done to welcome Tết Nguyên Đán in Ho Chi Minh City, 2009

It was approximated that 4.3 million tourists visited Vietnam in 2007, of which 70%, approximately 3 million tourists, visited the city. Ho Chi Minh City welcomed 6 million tourists in 2017. According to Mastercard's 2019 report, the city is the country's second most visited city (18th in Asia Pacific), with 4.1 million overnight international visitors in 2018 (after Hanoi with 4.8 million visitors). In H12025, HCMC welcomed over 22.1 million visitors (3.8 million international and 18.3 million domestic), generating approximately ₫118 trillion (~US $4.6 billion), a +27.3% year-over-year growth. Over the Tết 2025 holiday, the city led all Vietnamese provinces in tourism receipts with ~$303 million, up 17% from 2024. In September 2025, HCMC is hosting ITE HCMC 2025 which focuses on sustainable tourism and trade networking and is the 19th of its kind.

== Culture ==
=== Museums and art galleries ===
Ho Chi Minh City houses various museums and art galleries, including the Ho Chi Minh City Museum of Fine Arts, the Ho Chi Minh City Museum of History, the War Remnants Museum, the Ho Chi Minh City Opera House, the Southern Women's Museum, etc.

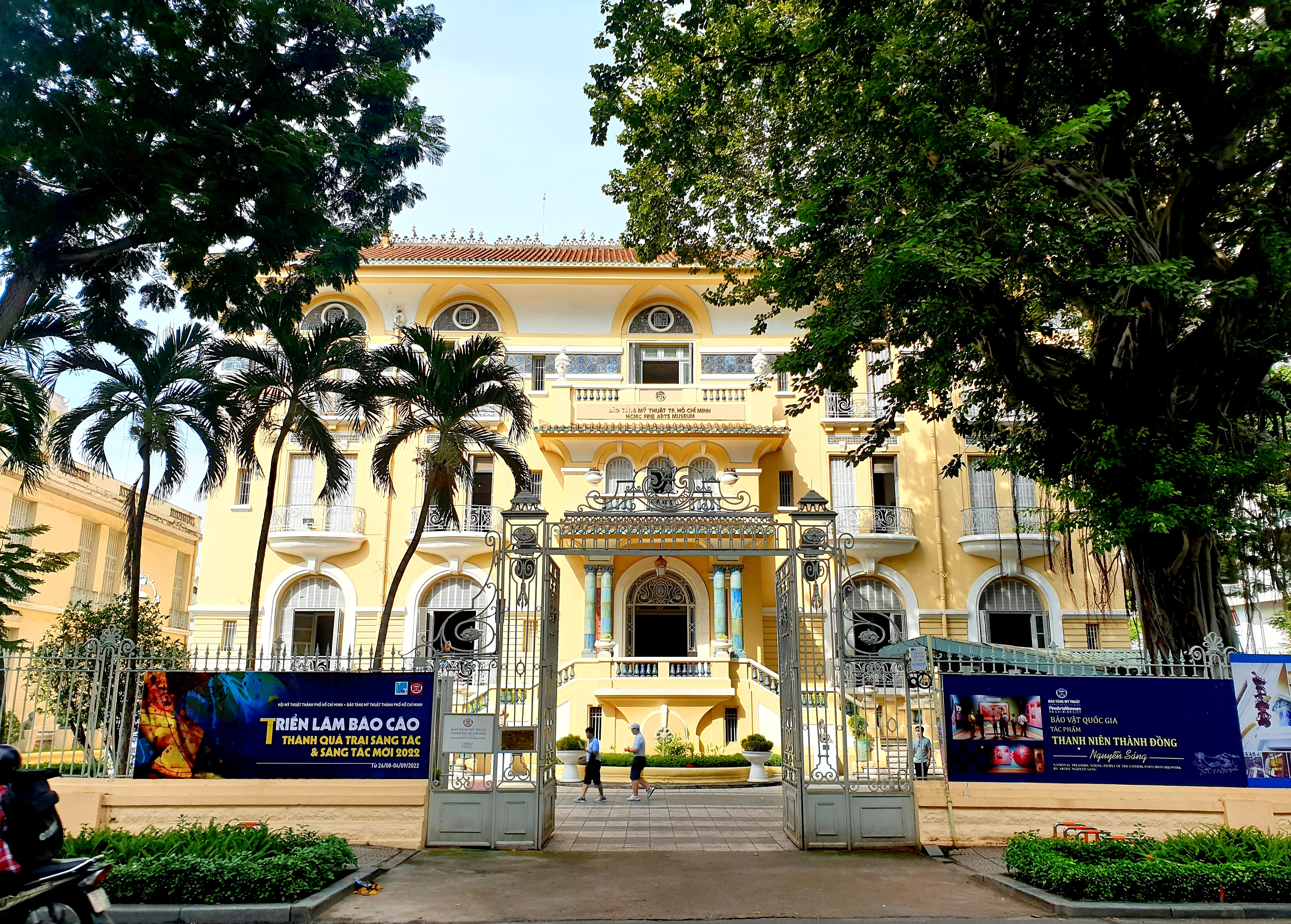
Ho Chi Minh City Museum of Fine Arts

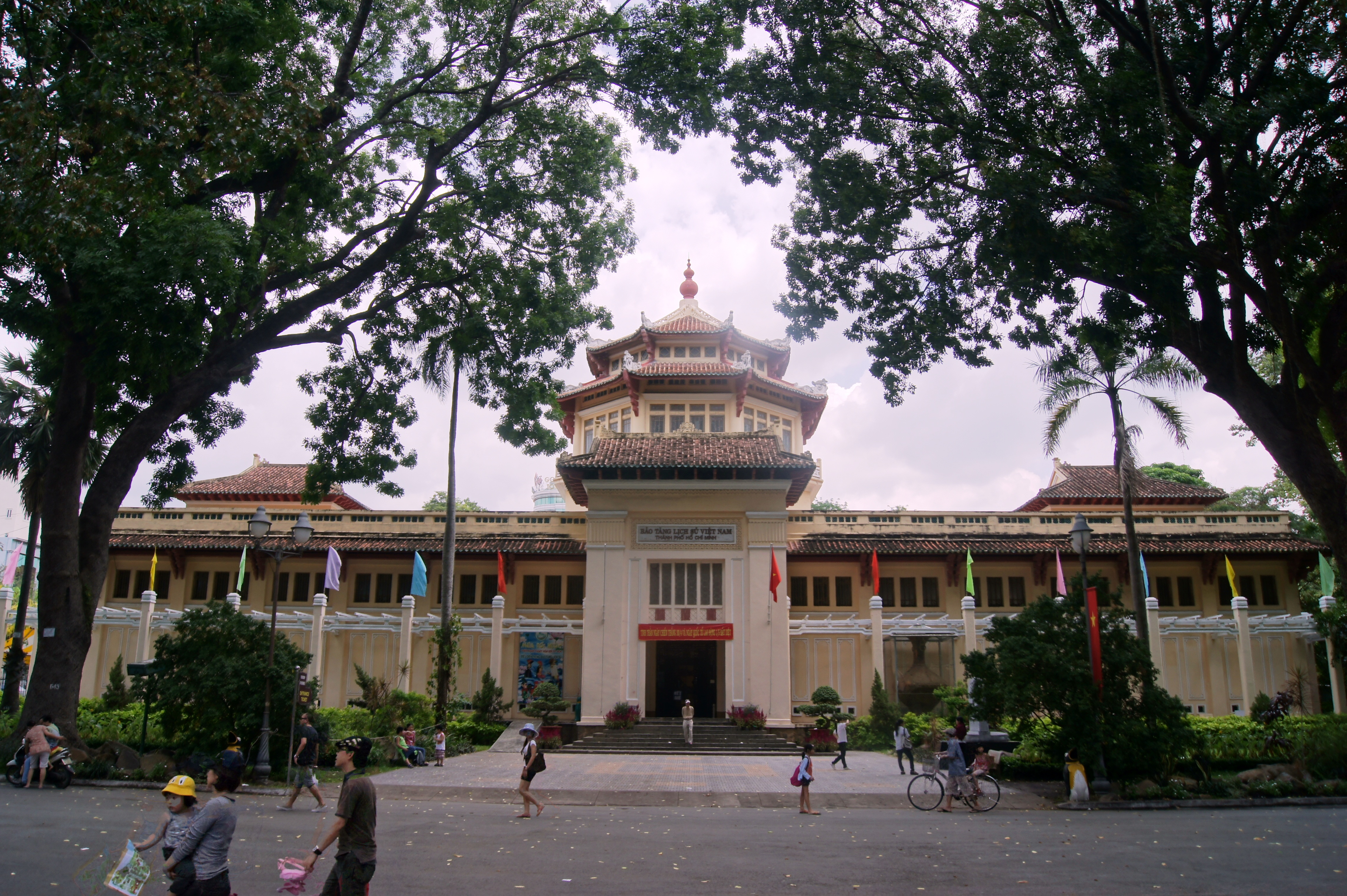
Ho Chi Minh City Museum of History

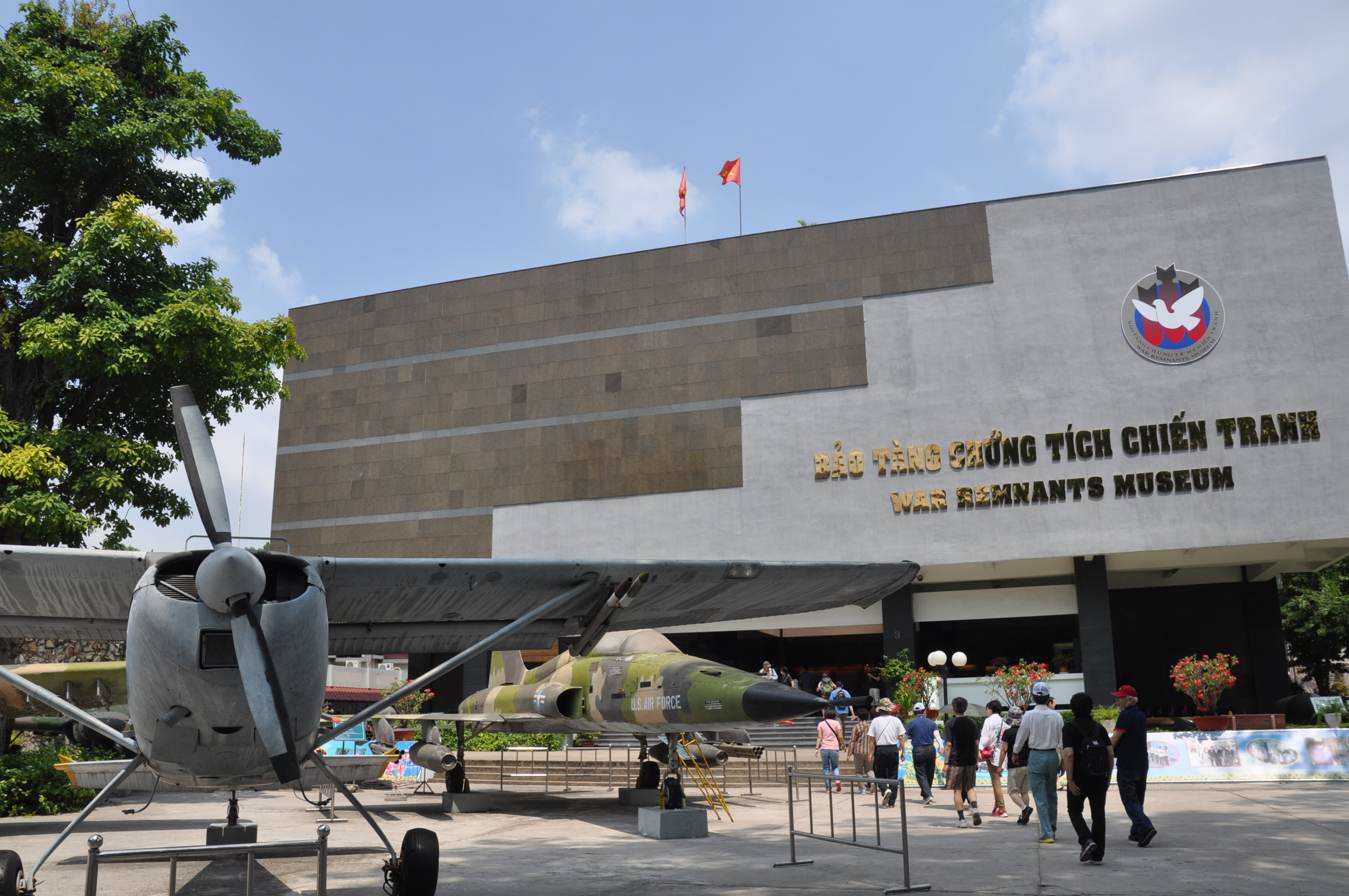
War Remnants Museum

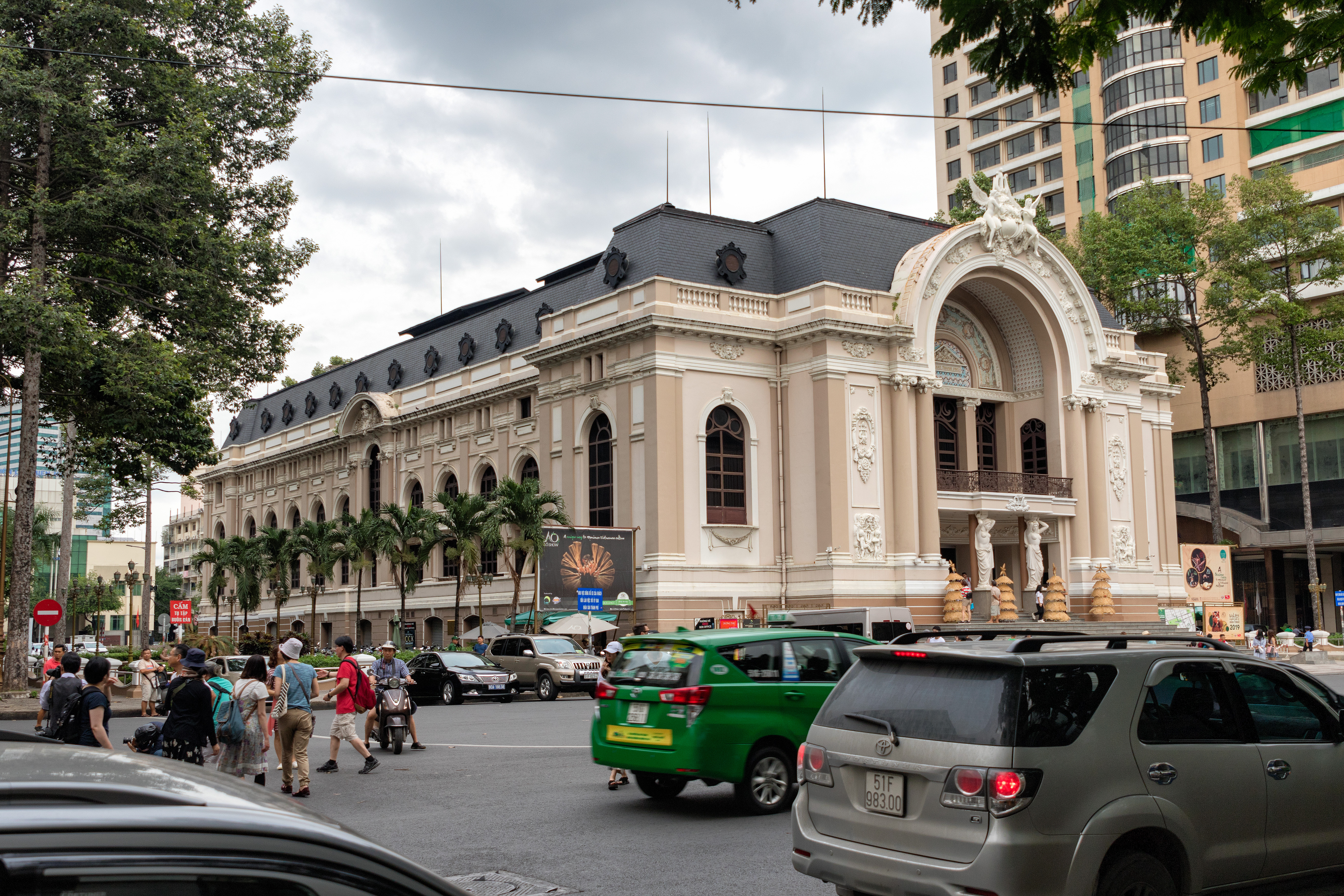
Ho Chi Minh City Opera House

Ho Chi Minh City has roadside restaurants, coffee shops, and food stalls where locals and tourists can use local cuisine and beverages. It is ranked in the top five best cities in the world for street food.

=== Sport ===
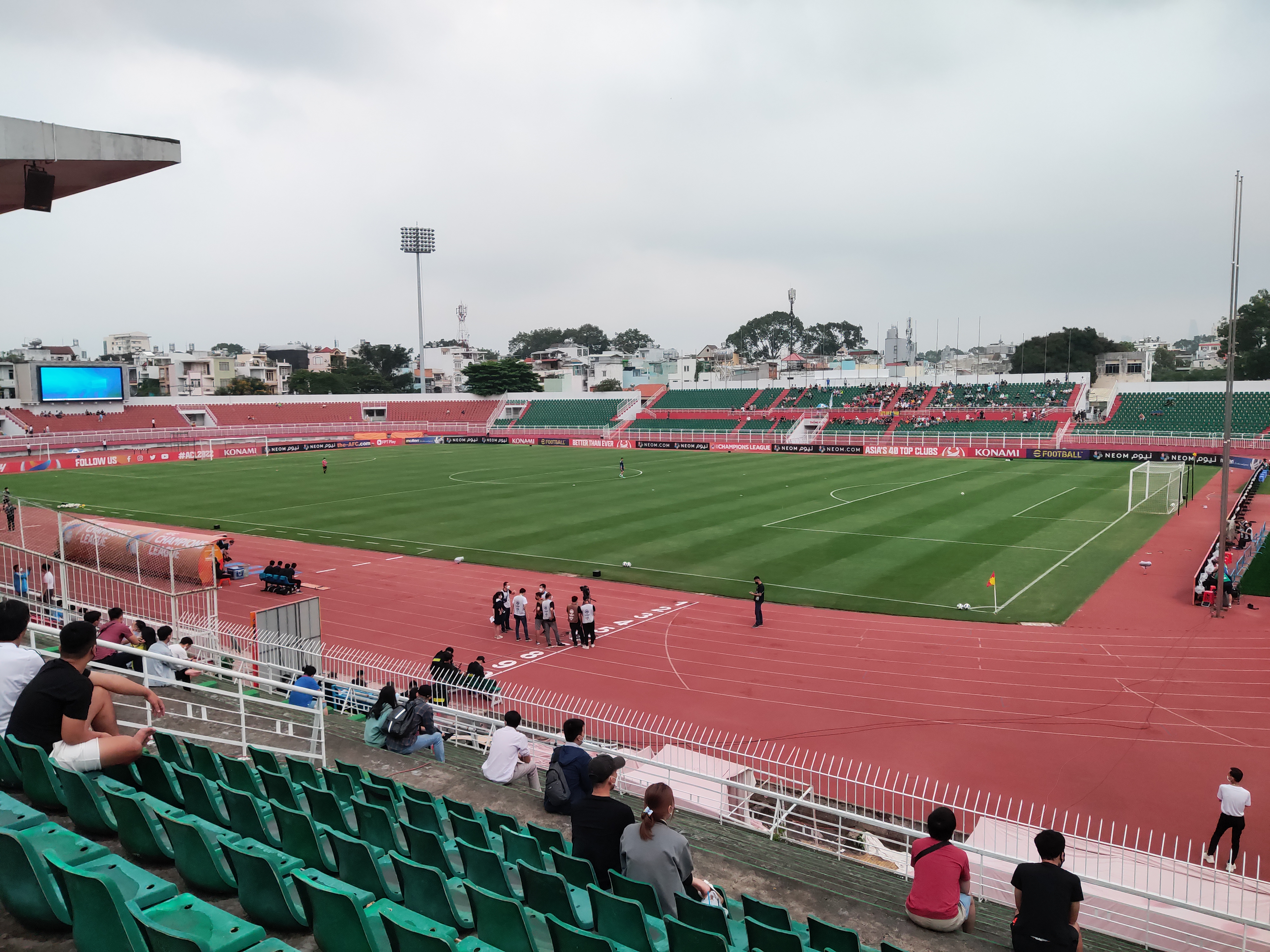
Thống Nhất Stadium is home to the V.League 1 association football club Ho Chi Minh City F.C.

As of 2005, Ho Chi Minh City was home to 91 association football fields, 86 swimming pools, and 256 gyms. The largest stadium in the city is the 15,000-seat Thống Nhất Stadium, located on Đào Duy Từ Street, Diên Hồng ward. The next largest is Military Region 7 Stadium, located near Tan Son Nhat Airport in Tân Sơn Hòa. The Military Region 7 Stadium was of the venues for the 2007 AFC Asian Cup finals. Phú Thọ Racecourse, another sporting venue established during colonial times, was the only racetrack in Vietnam, now it is place for Phú Thọ Indoor Stadium and Phú Thọ Circus.

The city is home to a number of association football clubs. Ho Chi Minh City F.C. is based at Thống Nhất Stadium, formerly as Cảng Sài Gòn, it was four-time champions of Vietnam's V.League 1 (in 1986, 1993–94, 1997, and 2001–02). Navibank Saigon F.C., founded as Quân Khu 4, was also based at Thống Nhất Stadium, emerged as champions of the First Division in the 2008 season, and was promoted to the V-League in 2009, the club has since been dissolved during a corruption scandal.

In 2011, the city was awarded an expansion team for the ASEAN Basketball League. Saigon Heat was the first ever international professional basketball team to represent Vietnam. In 2016, a second professional basketball team was created, Wings, playing in the domestic Vietnam Basketball Association. The city hosts international sport events throughout the year, such as the AFF Futsal Championship and the Vietnam Vertical Run. Other sports are represented by teams in the city, such as Irish (Gaelic) Football, rugby, cricket, volleyball, basketball, chess, athletics, and table tennis.

== International relations ==
=== Twin towns – sister cities ===
The city is twinned with:

- Ahmadi Governorate, Kuwait (2010)
- Almaty, Kazakhstan (2011)
- Auvergne-Rhône-Alpes, France (1998)
- Bangkok, Thailand (2014)
- Champasak Province, Laos (2001)
- Busan, South Korea (1995)
- Guangdong Province, China (2009)
- Guangxi Zhuang Autonomous Region, China (2013)
- Leipzig, Germany (2021)
- Liverpool, United Kingdom (2025)
- Lyon, France (1997)
- Manila, Philippines (1994)
- Minsk, Belarus (2008)
- Moscow, Russia (2003)
- New York City, United States (2023)
- Osaka Prefecture, Japan (2007)
- Phnom Penh, Cambodia (1999)
- Saint Petersburg, Russia (2005)
- San Francisco, United States (1995)
- Seattle, United States (2023)
- Shandong Province, China (2013)
- Shanghai, China (1994)
- Sofia, Bulgaria (2015)
- Vientiane, Laos (2001)
- Vladivostok, Russia (2009)
- Yangon, Myanmar (2012)
- Zhejiang Province, China (2009)

=== Cooperation and friendship ===
In addition to its twin towns, the city is in cooperation with:

- Barcelona, Spain (2009)
- Budapest, Hungary (2013)
- Daegu, South Korea (2015)
- Geneva, Switzerland (2007)
- Guangzhou, China (1996)
- Johannesburg, South Africa (2009)
- Košice, Slovakia (2016)
- Moscow Oblast, Russia (2015)
- Northern Territory, Australia (2014)
- Osaka, Japan (2011)
- Queensland, Australia (2005)
- Seville, Spain (2009)
- Shenyang, China (1999)
- Shiga Prefecture, Japan (2014)
- Sverdlovsk Oblast, Russia (2000)
- Toronto, Canada (2006)
- Yokohama, Japan (2009)

== See also ==
- 175 Hospital
- List of historic buildings in Ho Chi Minh City
