= List of shopping malls in Vietnam =

The following is a list of shopping malls in Vietnam:

== Ho Chi Minh City ==
No.	Name	Location	Year opened	Retail Area	Owner
1	AEON Mall Tan Phu Celadon	Tân Sơn Nhì, Tân Phú district, Ho Chi Minh City	2014	84,000 m²	AEON Vietnam
2	AEON Mall Binh Tan	An Lạc, Bình Tân district, Ho Chi Minh City	2016	114,000 m²	AEON Vietnam
3	Central Premium	Chánh Hưng, District 8, Ho Chi Minh City	2024		Thiên Bình
4	Crescent Mall	Phú Mỹ Hưng urban area, District 7, Ho Chi Minh City	2011		Phu My Hung Corporation
5	Diamond Plaza	Bến Nghé, District 1, Ho Chi Minh City	2000	14,800 m²	Lotte Corporation & VNSteel
6	Icon68 Shopping Center (Bitexco Financial Tower)	Bến Nghé, District 1, Ho Chi Minh City	2013	10,000 m²	Bitexco Group
7	NowZone (Royal Towers)	Cầu Ông Lãnh, District 1, Ho Chi Minh City	2008	37,000 m²	Fei Yueh Vietnam
8	Estella Place (Estella Heights)	An Phú, Thủ Đức	2018		Keppel Ltd., Tiến Phước
9	Gigamall	Hiệp Bình Chánh, Thủ Đức	2019		Khang Gia Land
10	Hùng Vương Plaza (formerly Parkson in the prefix)	District 5, Ho Chi Minh City	2007 / 2023 (without Parkson)		Kido
11	Menas Mall Saigon Airport (Vietjet Plaza; formerly Parkson CT Plaza)	Tân Sơn Hòa, Tân Bình district	2009 (as Parkson) / 2020		Menas Group (previously CT Group)
12	Metrolink An Phú (formerly Parkson Cantavil Premier)	An Phú, Thủ Đức	2013 / 2025 (as Metrolink An Phú)		Daewon, Thuduc House
13	One Central Saigon	Bến Thành, District 1, Ho Chi Minh City	2028	19,999 m^{2}	Masterise
14	Pandora City	Tây Thạnh, Tân Phú district, Ho Chi Minh City	2012		Tafoco
15	Parc Mall	Chánh Hưng, District 8, Ho Chi Minh City	2024	55,000 m²	Vạn Thái Land
16	Pearl Plaza	Thạnh Mỹ Tây, Bình Thạnh district	2015		SSG
17	Rex Arcade (Rex Hotel)	Bến Nghé, District 1, Ho Chi Minh City	2010	2,000 m²	IPPG
18	Saigon Centre / Takashimaya	Bến Nghé, District 1, Ho Chi Minh City	1996 / 2017	55,000 m²	Keppel Ltd., Resco & Takashimaya
19	Saigontourist Plaza (formerly Parkson in the prefix)	Bến Nghé, District 1, Ho Chi Minh City	2005 (Parkson departed in 2023)		Saigontourist
20	SC VivoCity	Tân Phong, District 7, Ho Chi Minh City	2015	72,000 m²	Mapletree Investments & Saigon Co.op
21	The Emporium (formerly Parkson Flemington)	Phú Thọ Horse Racing Ground, District 11, Ho Chi Minh City	2009 (as Parkson) / 2018 (rebrand)		Pau Jar Group
22	Thiso Mall Sala	Thủ Thiêm new urban area, Thủ Đức	2022		Thaco
23	Thiso Mall Trường Chinh - Phan Huy Ích	An Hội Tây, Gò Vấp district	2023		Thaco
24	Union Square Saigon (formerly Vincom Center A)	Bến Nghé, District 1, Ho Chi Minh City	2011	38,000 m²	VIPD Group
25	Vincom Center Đồng Khởi	Bến Nghé, District 1, Ho Chi Minh City	2010		Vingroup
26	Vincom Center Landmark 81	Thạnh Mỹ Tây, Bình Thạnh district	2018	59,000 m²	Vingroup
27	Vincom Mega Mall Grand Park	Long Bình, Ho Chi Minh City	2024		Vingroup
28	Vincom Mega Mall Thảo Điền	Thảo Điền, Thủ Đức	2015		Vingroup
29	Vincom Plaza Phan Văn Trị	An Nhơn, Ho Chi Minh City	2016	30,521 m^{2}	Vingroup
30	Vincom Plaza Quang Trung	Gò Vấp, Ho Chi Minh City	2015		Vingroup
31	Vincom Plaza Thủ Đức	Thủ Đức, Ho Chi Minh City	2015		Vingroup
32	Vincom Plaza Lê Văn Việt	Tăng Nhơn Phú, Ho Chi Minh City	2018		Vingroup
33	Vạn Hạnh Mall	Hòa Hưng, Ho Chi Minh City	2018		Kido

== Hanoi ==
- AEON Mall Long Bien
- AEON Mall Ha Dong
- Trang Tien Plaza
- Hanoi Centre
- Vincom Center Ba Trieu
- Vincom Center Metropolis
- Vincom Center Nguyen Chi Thanh
- Vincom Mega Mall Royal City
- Vincom Mega Mall Times City
- Vincom Plaza Long Bien
- Vincom Center Pham Ngoc Thach
- Vincom Plaza Bac Tu Liem
- Lotte Center Hanoi
- Lotte Mall West Lake
- Mipec Tay Son
- Mipec Long Bien
- The Loop by Takashimaya at Indochina Plaza Hanoi
- The Garden Shopping Center

== Da Nang ==
- Parkson Vinh Trung Plaza
- Vincom Plaza Ngo Quyen
- Lotte Mart
- TTC Plaza / AEON Mall Da Nang
- Go

== Can Tho ==
- Vincom Plaza Hung Vuong
- Vincom Plaza Xuan Khanh

== Hai Phong ==
- Parkson Thuy Duong Plaza
- Vincom Plaza Le Thanh Tong
- AEON Mall Hai Phong Le Chan
- Vincom Plaza Imperia Hai Phong

== An Giang ==
- Vincom Plaza Long Xuyen

== Binh Duong ==
- AEON Mall Binh Duong Canary
- Sora Gardens SC
- Vincom Plaza Di An

== Dak Lak ==
- Vincom Plaza Buon Ma Thuot

== Dong Nai ==
- Vincom Plaza Bien Hoa
- AEON Mall Bien Hoa

== Phu Tho ==
- Vincom Plaza Viet Tri

== Quang Ninh ==
- Vincom Plaza Ha Long
- Vincom Plaza Mong Cai
- Vincom Plaza Cam Pha

== Quang Ngai ==
- Vincom Plaza Quang Ngai

== Thái Bình ==
- Vincom Plaza Ly Bon

== Defunct ==
- Parkson Viet Tower Plaza (closed, only for office and F&B leasing)
- Saigon Tax Trade Centre
