= An Hội Tây =

An Hội Tây Phường An Hội Tây An Hội
- Ward
- Interactive map of An Hội Tây
- Coordinates: 10°50′31″N 106°38′25″E
- Country: Vietnam
- Municipality: Ho Chi Minh City
- Established: June 16, 2025

Government
  - Type: Ward-level authority

Area
  - Total: 1.47 sq mi (3.81 km^{2})

Population (2024)
  - Total: 121,004
  - Density: 82,300/sq mi (31,800/km^{2})
- Time zone: UTC+07:00 (Indochina Time)
- Postal code: 71427
- Administrative code: 26882

An Hội Tây (Vietnamese: Phường An Hội Tây) is a ward of Ho Chi Minh City, Vietnam. It is one of the 168 new wards, communes and special zones of the city following the reorganization in 2025.

== Geography ==
An Hội Tây is bordered by the following wards:

- An Hội Đông and Thông Tây Hội to the east
- Đông Hưng Thuận to the west
- Tân Sơn to the south
- Thới An and Tân Thới Hiệp to the north.

According to Official Dispatch No. 2896/BNV-CQĐP dated May 27, 2025 of the Ministry of Home Affairs, following the merger, An Hội Tây has a land area of 3.81 km², the population as of December 31, 2024 is 121,004 people, the population density is 31,760 people/km².

== History ==
On June 16, 2025, the National Assembly Standing Committee issued Resolution No. 1685/NQ-UBTVQH15 on the arrangement of commune-level administrative units of Ho Chi Minh City in 2025 (effective from June 16, 2025). Accordingly, the entire land area and population of Ward 12 and Ward 14 of the former Gò Vấp district will be integrated into a new ward named An Hội Tây (Clause 52, Article 1).

== Etymology ==
In the 2025 commune-level administrative unit arrangement, Ho Chi Minh City has advocated naming new wards and communes with letters (no longer naming them with numbers) with many considerations from the history of the land, familiarity and cultural values.This policy has been widely supported by the people. Among them, some old place names such as Saigon, Gia Dinh, Cho Lon, etc... have been restored.

In which, An Hội is the name of a bronze casting village. In addition, An Hội is also the name of an ancient communal house that has been recognized as a City-level architectural and artistic relic.

== Social security ==
The first SOS Children's Villages in Vietnam is located at the ward at the corner street of Quang Trung and Tân Sơn, known as SOS Children's Villages Gò Vấp. It including the public escalator school named after its founder, Hermann Gmeiner. It was started to build in 1967, and first completed in 1968, the plan for the SOS Children's Villages here was also started by Gmeiner.
