= Gò Vấp =

Gò Vấp Phường Gò Vấp Hanh Thông Tây, Xóm Thuốc
- Ward
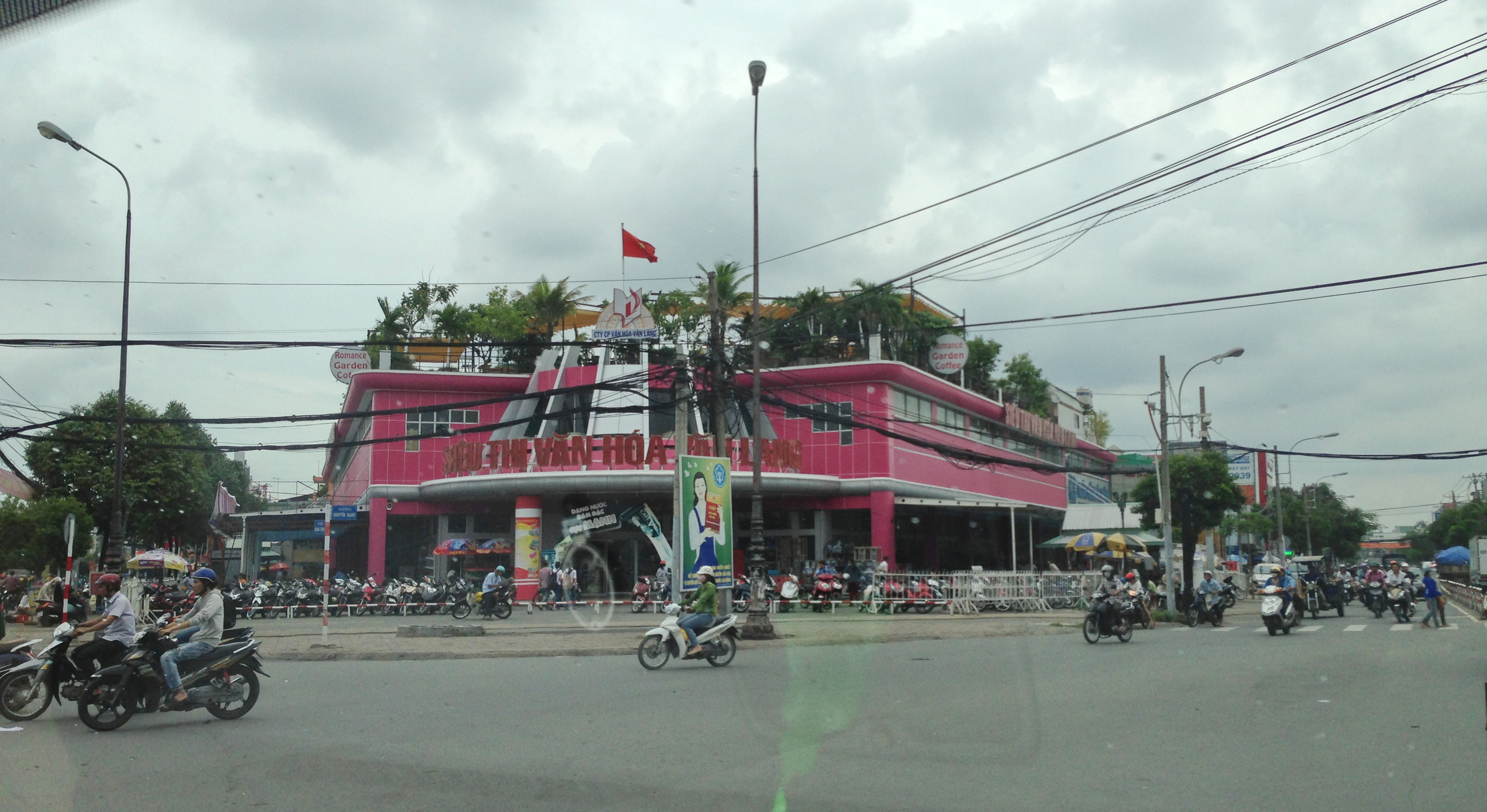
- Văn Lang Center at the Gò Vấp 6-way intersection
- Interactive map of Gò Vấp
- Coordinates: 10°49′49″N 106°40′14″E
- Country: Vietnam
- Municipality: Ho Chi Minh City
- Established: June 16th 2025

Area
  - Total: 1.08 sq mi (2.81 km^{2})

Population (2024)
  - Total: 110,850
  - Density: 102,000/sq mi (39,400/km^{2})
- Time zone: UTC+07:00 (Indochina Time)
- Administrative code: 26884

Gò Vấp (Vietnamese: Phường Gò Vấp) is a ward of Ho Chi Minh City, Vietnam. It is one of the 168 new wards, communes and special zones of the city following the reorganization in 2025.

== Etymology ==
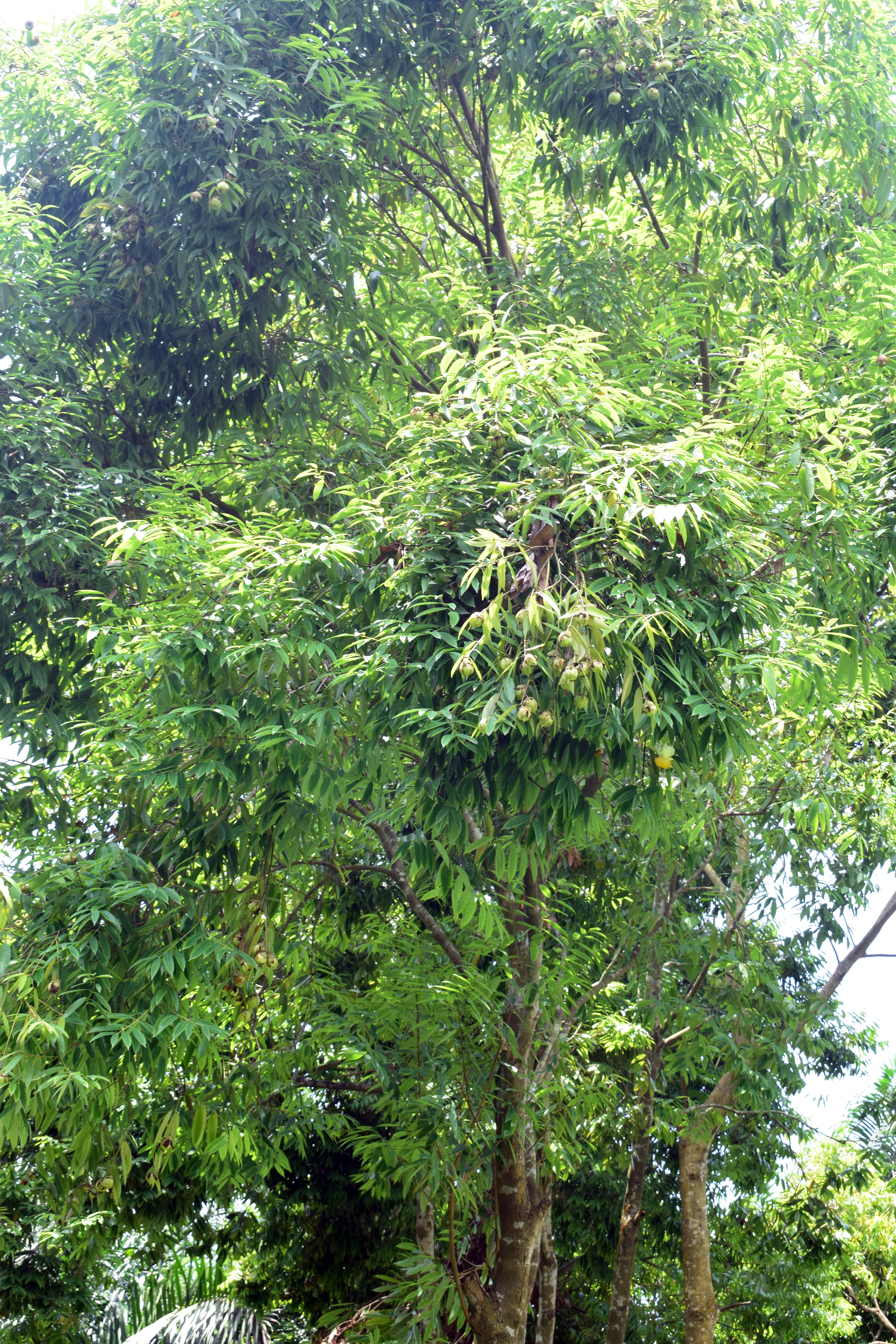
The "Vấp" tree (Mesua ferrea)

Currently, there is no accurate information regarding the name Gò Vấp.

There is a theory that the origin of the name Gò Vấp was actually a misspelling of Gò Vắp, according to researchers they believed that it comes from the fact that this area used to be a hill planted with vấp trees.

== History ==
On June 16, 2025, the National Assembly Standing Committee issued Resolution No. 1685/NQ-UBTVQH15 on the arrangement of commune-level administrative units of Ho Chi Minh City in 2025 (effective from June 16, 2025). Accordingly, the entire land area and population of Ward 10 and Ward 17 of the former Gò Vấp district will be integrated into a new ward named Gò Vấp (Clause 49, Article 1).

== Geography ==
Gò Vấp is a ward of the inner Ho Chi Minh City, located 7 km north of Saigon ward (as the crow flies), with the following geographical location:

- To the north, it borders An Phú Đông by Bến Cát Canal.
- To the northwest, it borders An Hội Đông by Bà Miên Canal with Nguyễn Văn Lượng Street
- To the south, it borders Hạnh Thông and Tân Sơn by Tan Son Nhat International Airport defense wall
- To the east, it borders Hạnh Thông by Nguyễn Oanh – Phạm Huy Thông Street and An Nhơn by Lê Đức Thọ Street with Nguyễn Oanh Street
- To the west, it borders Thông Tây Hội by Thống Nhất Street.

According to Official Dispatch No. 2896/BNV-CQĐP dated May 27, 2025 of the Ministry of Home Affairs, following the merger, Gò Vấp has a land area of 2.81 km², the population as of December 31, 2024 is 110,850 people, the population density is 39,400 people/km².

== Division ==
Gò Vấp ward is divided in to 47 numerical quarters by order: 1, 2, 3, 4, 5, 6, 7, 8, 9, 10, 11, 12, 13, 14, 15, 16, 17, 18, 19, 20, 21, 22, 23, 24, 25, 26, 27, 28, 29, 30, 31, 32, 33, 34, 35, 36, 37, 38, 39, 40, 41, 42, 43, 44, 45, 46, 47. Quarter 1 to 25 is the area of former Ward 10, the rest is of former Ward 17.

== Gallery ==
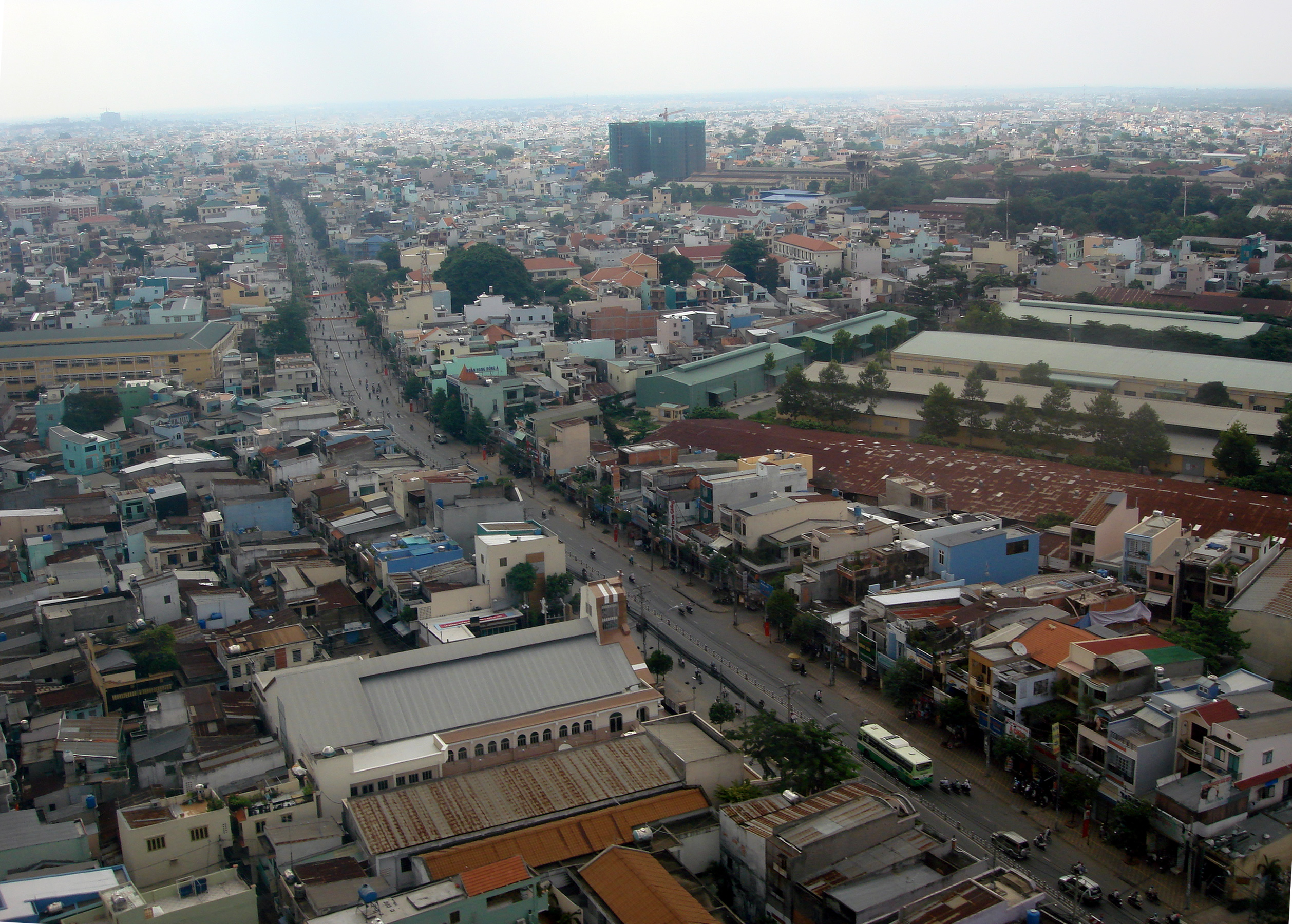
Quang Trung Street goes through Xóm Thuốc quarter of the ward

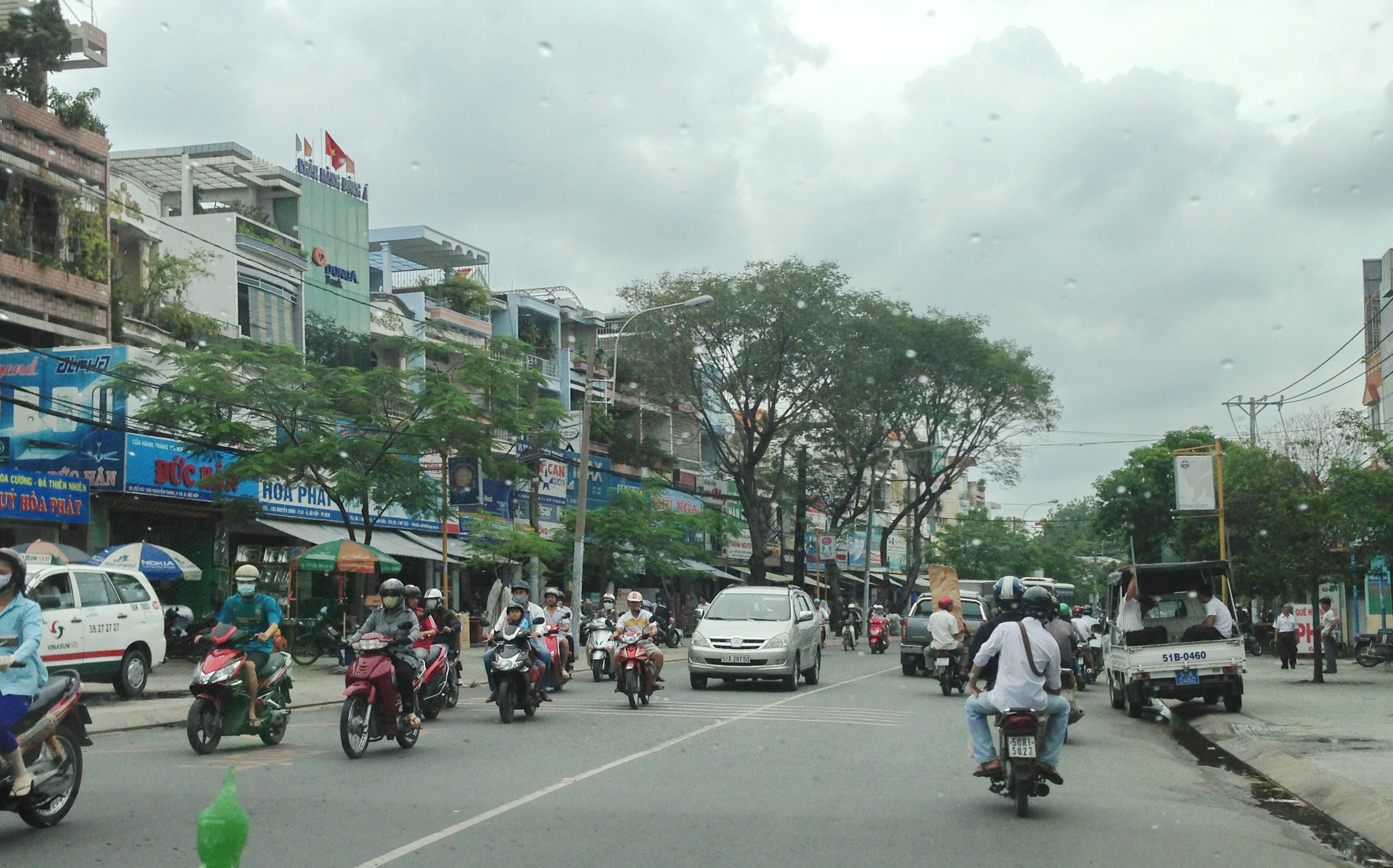
Nguyễn Oanh Street

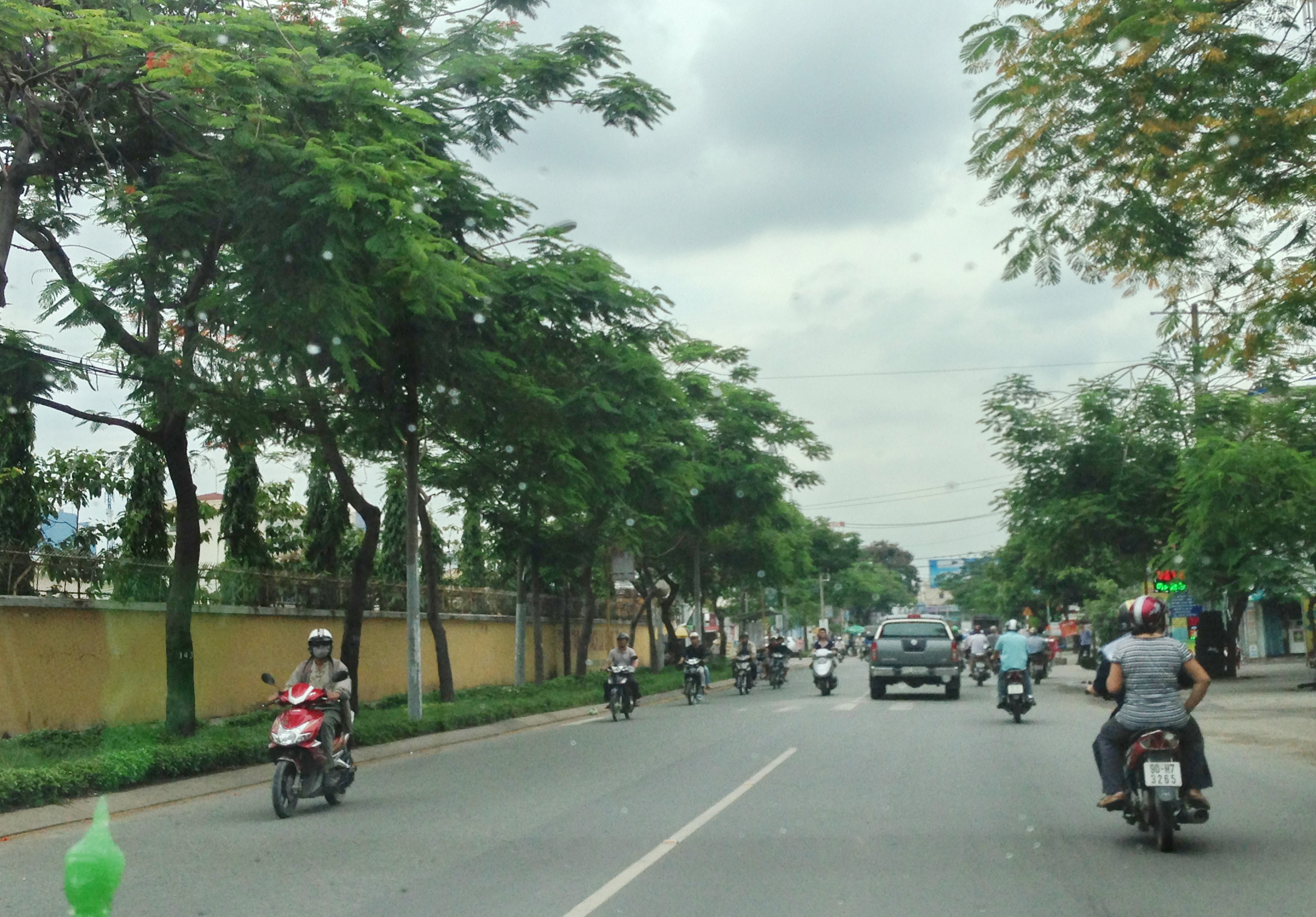
Nguyễn Oanh Street with wall of the 77th Air Defense Brigade of 7th Military Region

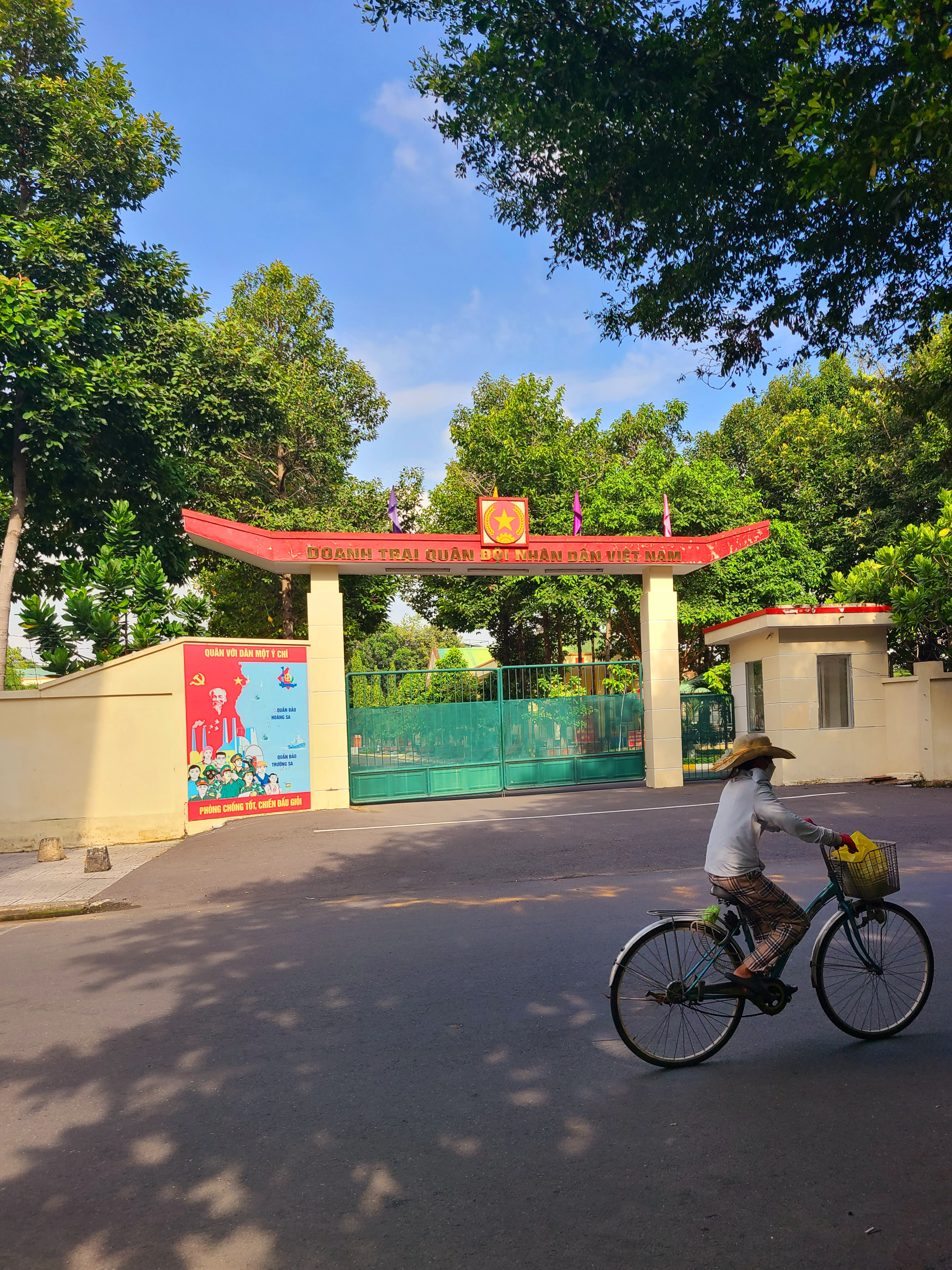
77th Air Defense Brigade of 7th Military Region

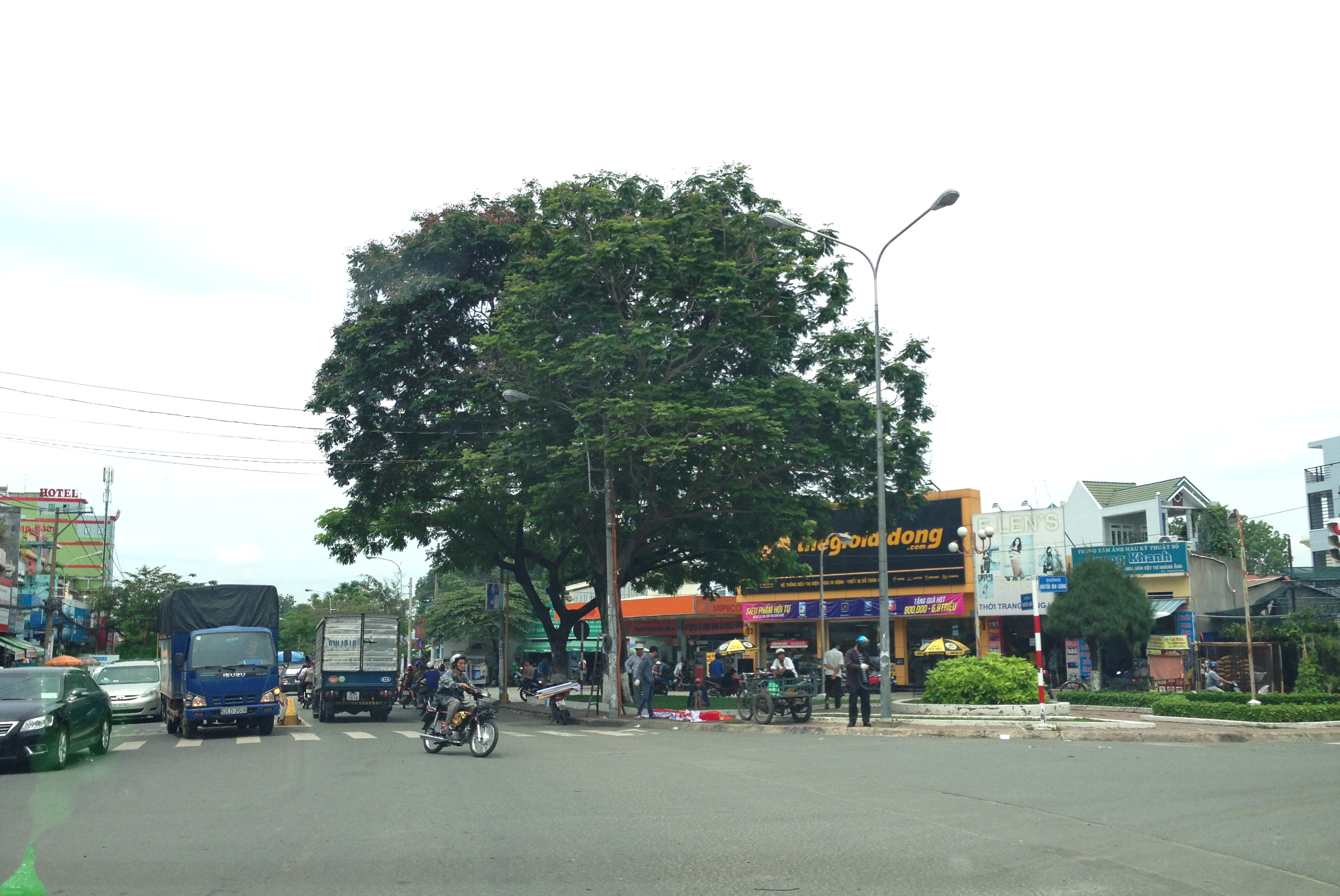
Nguyễn Oanh – Nguyễn Văn Lượng intersection

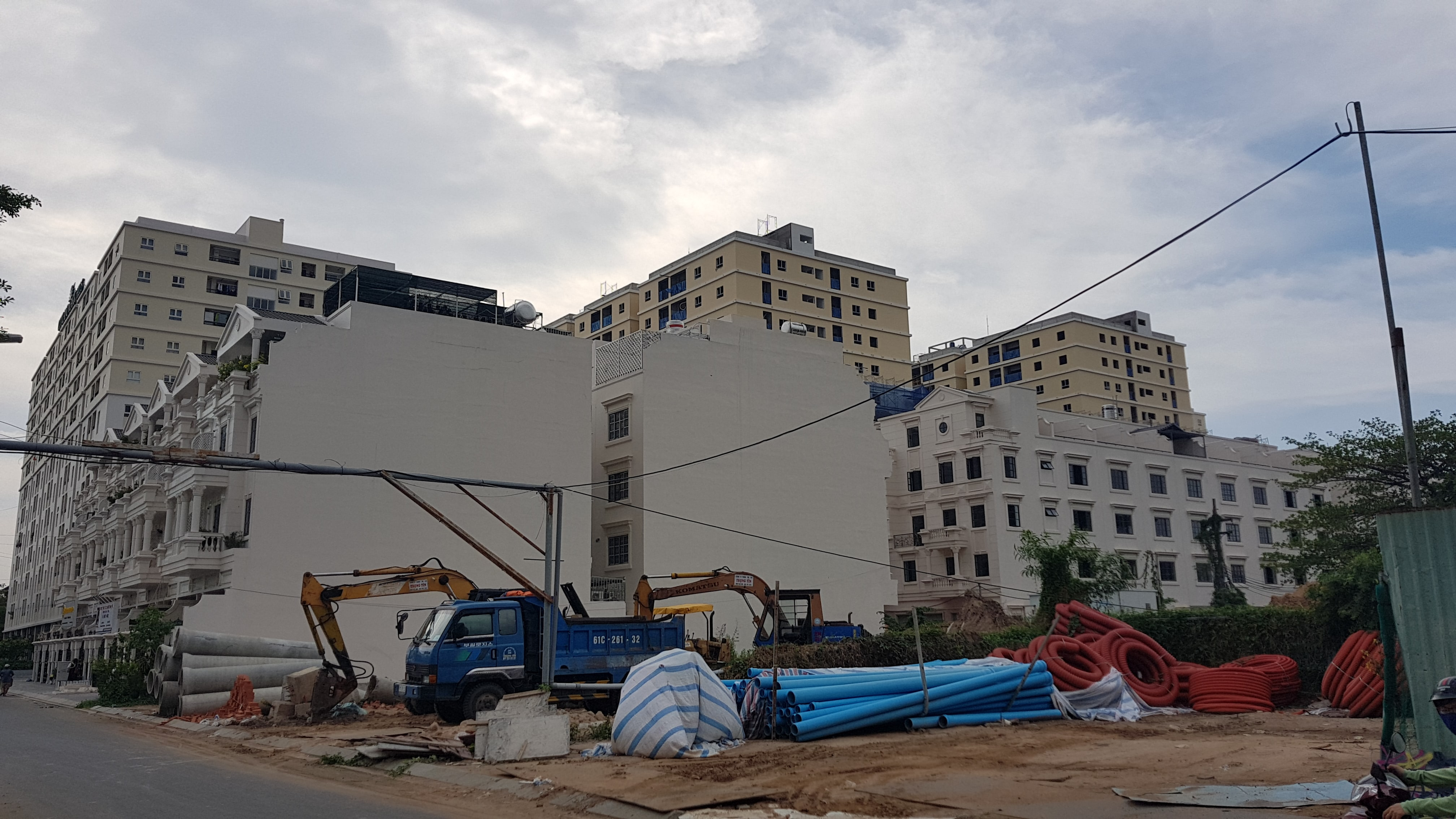
CityLand Park Hills urban development, formerly Zone B and D of Z751 Complex Enterprise
