= An Hội Đông =

An Hội Đông Phường An Hội Đông Xóm Mới
- Ward
- Interactive map of An Hội Đông
- Coordinates: 10°51′00″N 106°39′55″E
- Country: Vietnam
- Municipality: Ho Chi Minh City
- Established: June 16, 2025

Government
  - Type: Ward-level authority

Area
  - Total: 1.27 sq mi (3.29 km^{2})

Population (2024)
  - Total: 123,681
  - Density: 97,400/sq mi (37,600/km^{2})
- Time zone: UTC+07:00 (Indochina Time)
- Postal code: 71425
- Administrative code: 26878

An Hội Đông (Vietnamese: Phường An Hội Đông) is a ward of Ho Chi Minh City, Vietnam. It is one of the 168 new wards, communes and special zones of the city following the reorganization in 2025.

== Geography ==
An Hội Đông is bordered by the following wards:

- Thới An to the north
- An Hội Tây to the west
- Thông Tây Hội to the southwest
- Gò Vấp to the south
- An Phú Đông to the northeast

According to Official Dispatch No. 2896/BNV-CQĐP dated May 27, 2025 of the Ministry of Home Affairs, following the merger, An Hội Đông has a land area of 3.29 km², the population as of December 31, 2024 is 123,681 people, the population density is 37,593 people/km².

== History ==
On June 16, 2025, the National Assembly Standing Committee issued Resolution No. 1685/NQ-UBTVQH15 on the arrangement of commune-level administrative units of Ho Chi Minh City in 2025 (effective from June 16, 2025). Accordingly, the entire land area and population of Ward 15 and Ward 16 of the former Gò Vấp district will be integrated into a new ward named An Hội Đông (Clause 50, Article 1).

== Etymology ==
In the 2025 commune-level administrative unit arrangement, the city government has advocated to name new wards and communes with words instead of naming them with numbers. With many considerations from the history of the land, familiarity and cultural values. This policy has been widely supported by the people. Among them, some old place names such as Sài Gòn, Gia Định, Chợ Lớn, and others have been restored.

In which, An Hội is the name of a bronze casting village in the old Gò Vấp district. In addition, An Hội is also the name of an ancient communal house that has been recognized as a city-level architectural and artistic relic. Then they added "Đông" for east, hence the name: An Hội Đông.
