= AHD =

AHD or Ahd may refer to:

== Linguistics ==
- Althochdeutsch (Ahd.), the German name for Old High German
- The American Heritage Dictionary of the English Language

== Science and technology ==
- Acoustic hailing device, a high-powered loudspeaker for communicating at long distances
- Alveolar hydatid disease, a parasitic disease
- Analog High Definition, a standard for transmitting high-definition analog video
- Arteriosclerotic heart disease, a buildup of plaque in arteries leading to the heart
- Audio High Density, a digital disc format

== Other uses ==
- Ahd Party, a Jordanian political party
- Ardmore Downtown Executive Airport, Oklahoma, US (IATA code AHD)
- Ashtead railway station, Surrey, England, station code
- Australian Height Datum, a standard for measuring heights
- An Hoi Dong, a ward in Ho Chi Minh City
