= Thông Tây Hội =

Thông Tây Hội Phường Thông Tây Hội Hạnh Thông Tây, An Hội
- Ward
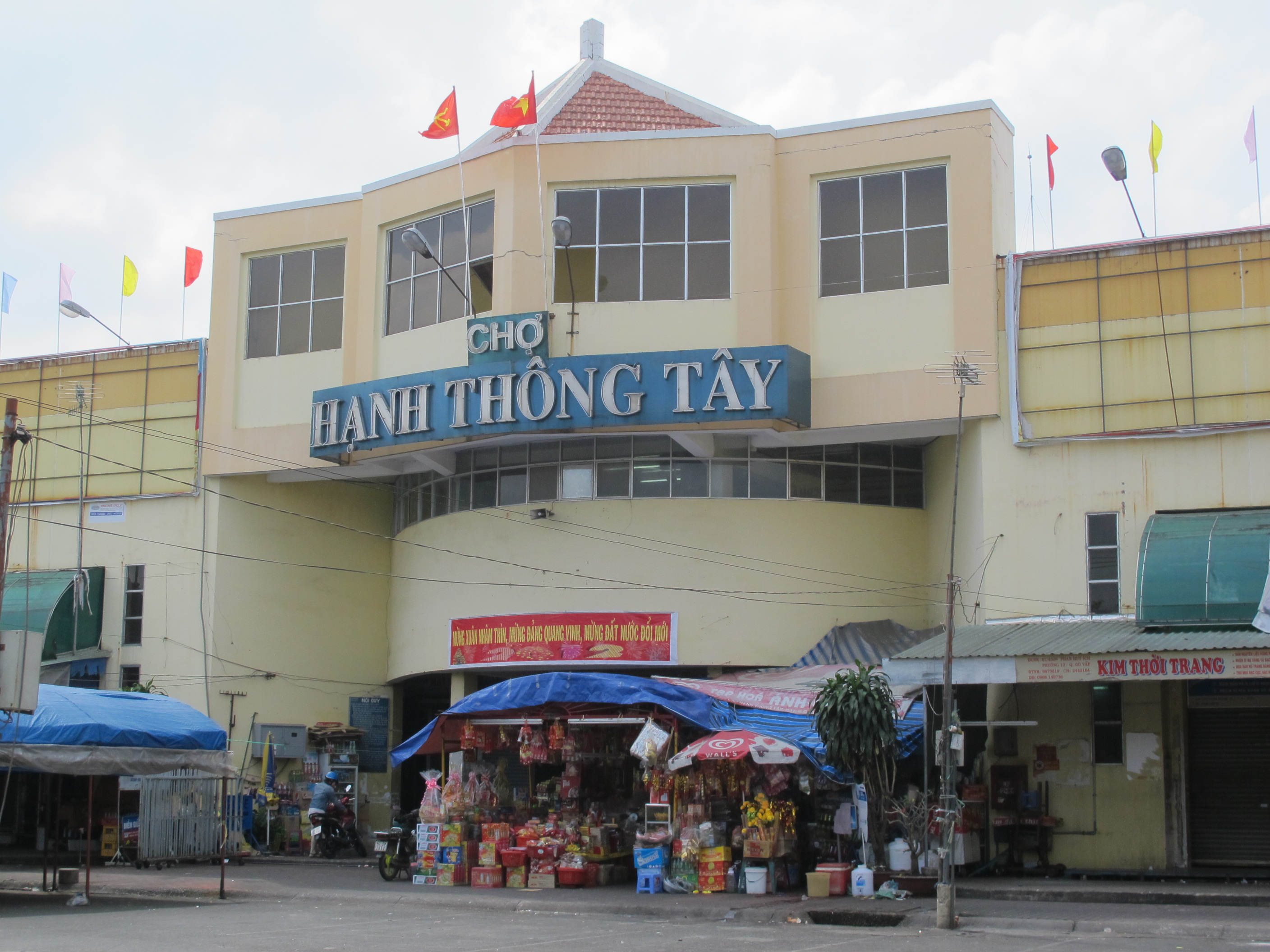
- Hạnh Thông Tây Market
- Interactive map of Thông Tây Hội
- Coordinates: 10°50′16″N 106°39′23″E
- Country: Vietnam
- Municipality: Ho Chi Minh City
- Established: June 16, 2025

Area
  - Total: 1.25 sq mi (3.24 km^{2})

Population (2024)
  - Total: 121,192
  - Density: 96,900/sq mi (37,400/km^{2})
- Time zone: UTC+07:00 (Indochina Time)
- Administrative code: 26898

Thông Tây Hội (Vietnamese: Phường Thông Tây Hội) is a ward of Ho Chi Minh City, Vietnam. It is one of the 168 new wards, communes and special zones of the city following the reorganization in 2025.

== History ==
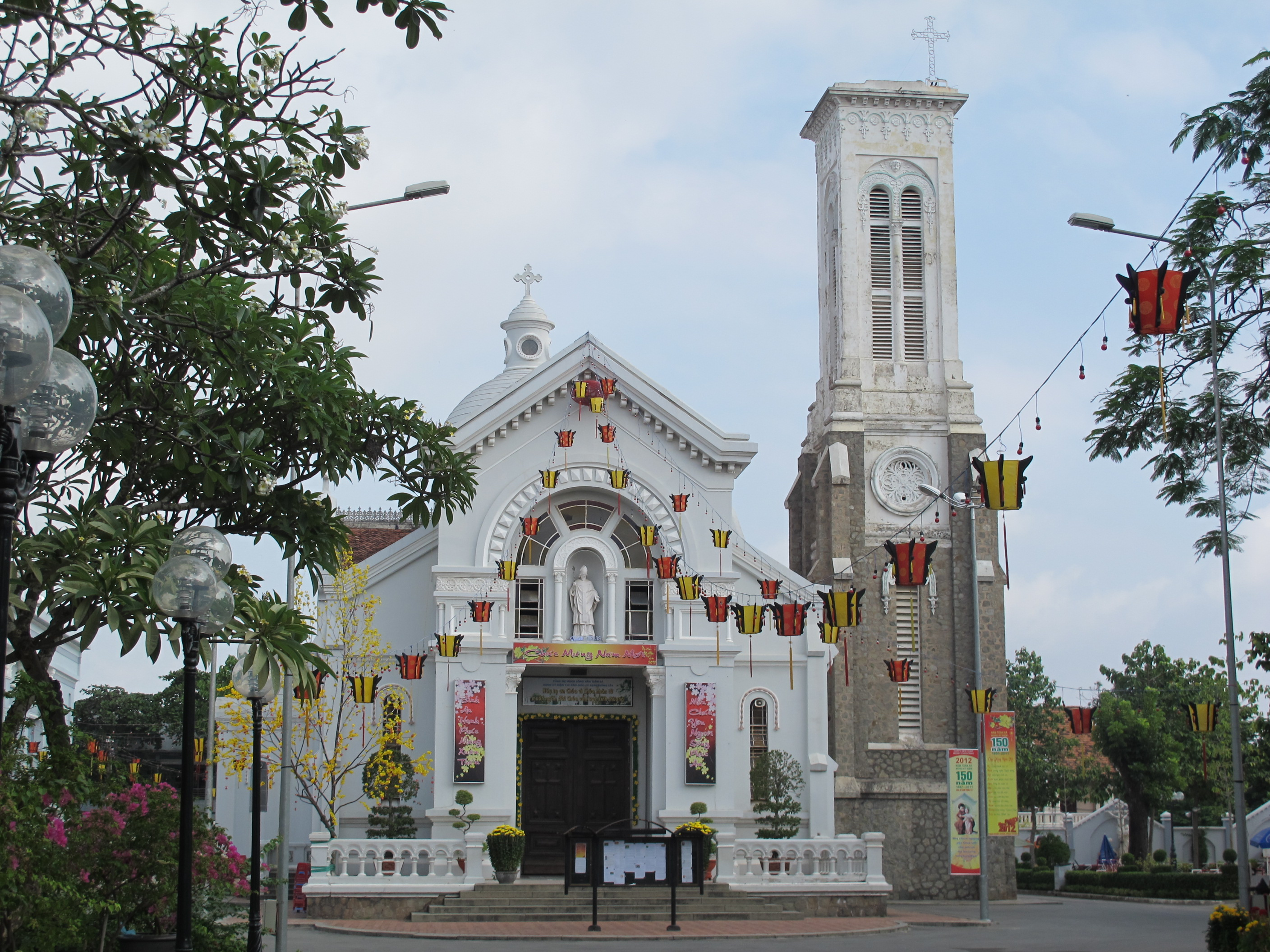
Hạnh Thông Tây Church

Before April 1975, Thông Tây Hội is a commune of Gò Vấp district (or county, based on the actual level of urbanization at that time, it could be same as huyện after 1975), Gia Định province.

In 1976, Thông Tây Hội commune is dissolved to establish new wards of Gò Vấp urban district, including Ward 11 and 12.

=== Ward 8 (1976-1983) ===
On July 11, 1983, the Council of Ministers issued Decision No. 70-HĐBT. Accordingly, Ward 8 and Ward 9 will be dissolved and merged into Wards 3, 4, 7, and 10 of Gò Vấp District then, most of them now are Hạnh Thông ward, except Ward 10 is now southern part of Gò Vấp ward, Ho Chi Minh City.

=== Ward 8 (2006-2025) ===
On November 23, 2006, the Government issued Decree No. 143/2006/ND-CP. Accordingly, Ward 8 was established based on the adjustment of 50.42 hectares of natural area and 14,694 people from Ward 12; and 66.34 hectares of natural area and 10,307 people from Ward 11.

After its establishment, Ward 8 has a natural area of 116.76 hectares and a population of 25,001 people. On November 2023, Ward 9 with a natural area of 83.83 hectares and a population of 31,799 people was merged into Ward 8 due to not meeting the criteria for population and area for a ward of urban district then.

On June 16, 2025, the National Assembly Standing Committee issued Resolution No. 1685/NQ-UBTVQH15 on the arrangement of commune-level administrative units of Ho Chi Minh City in 2025 (effective from June 16, 2025). Accordingly, the entire land area and population of Ward 8 and Ward 11 of the former Gò Vấp district will be integrated into a new ward named Thông Tây Hội (Clause 51, Article 1).

== Geography ==
Thông Tây Hội is a ward of the inner Ho Chi Minh City, located about 11 km north of Saigon ward (as the crow flies), with the following geographical location:

- To the north, it borders An Hội Đông by Thống Nhất Street, Road No.1 and Lê Văn Thọ Street
- To the south, it borders Tân Sơn by Tan Son Nhat International Airport defense wall
- To the east, it borders Gò Vấp by Thống Nhất Street
- To the west, it borders An Hội Tây by Phạm Văn Chiêu and Quang Trung Street.

According to Official Dispatch No. 2896/BNV-CQĐP dated May 27, 2025 of the Ministry of Home Affairs, following the merger, Thông Tây Hội has a land area of 3.24 km², the population as of December 31, 2024 is 121,192 people, the population density is 96,900 people/km².

== Economy ==
A few major companies from domestic to international ones opened their factories here, including:

- Sapuwa (Saigon Pure Water) with over 200 workers according to former Gò Vấp District government Facebook page (now is for Gò Vấp Ward), located on 683 Quang Trung Street
- Isuzu with over 500 workers in 2024, located on 695 Quang Trung Street
- Mercedes-Benz within 800 workers, located on 693 Quang Trung Street

== Gallery ==
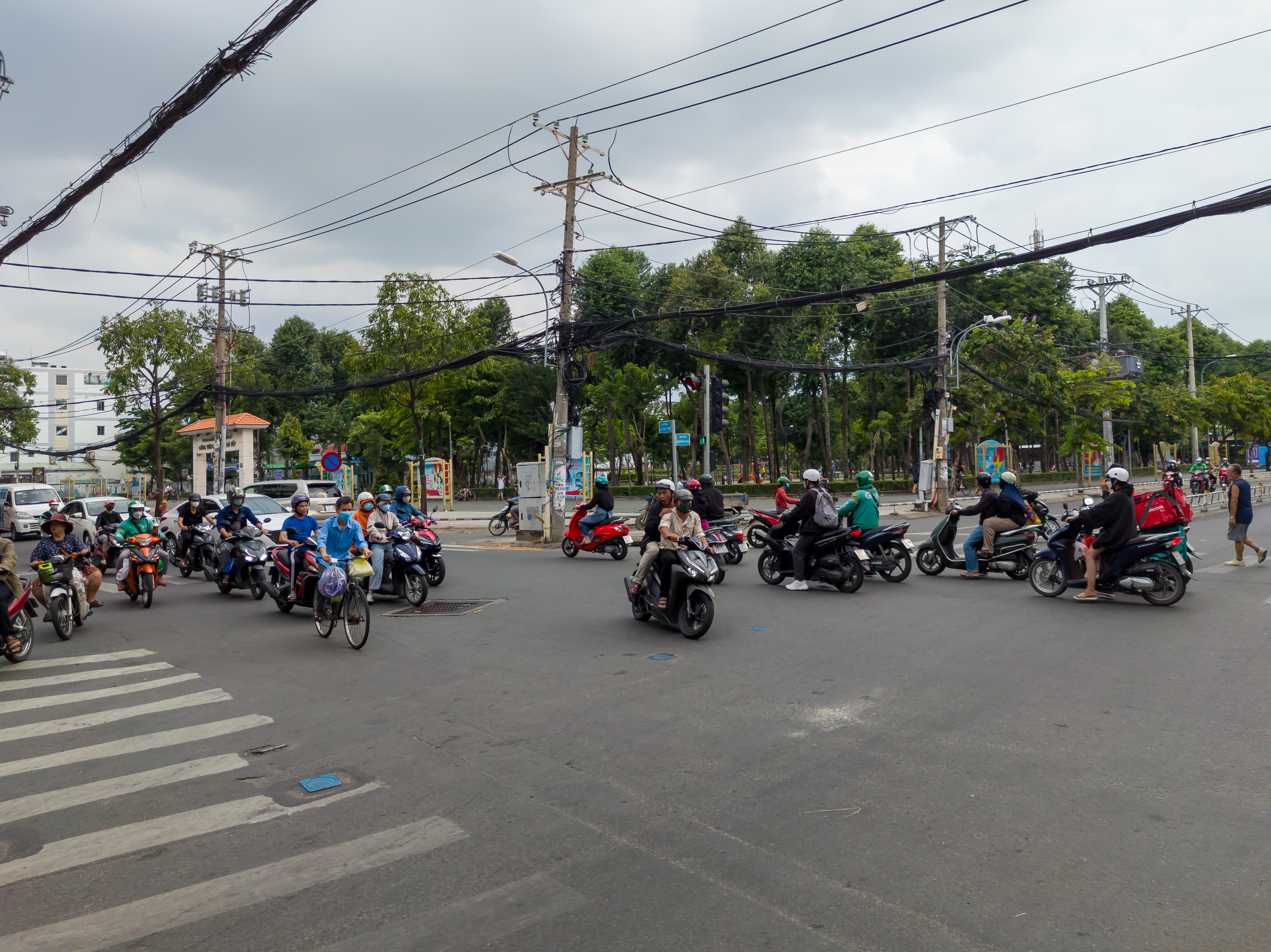
Làng Hoa Gò Vấp Park (lit. 'Gò Vấp Floral Village')

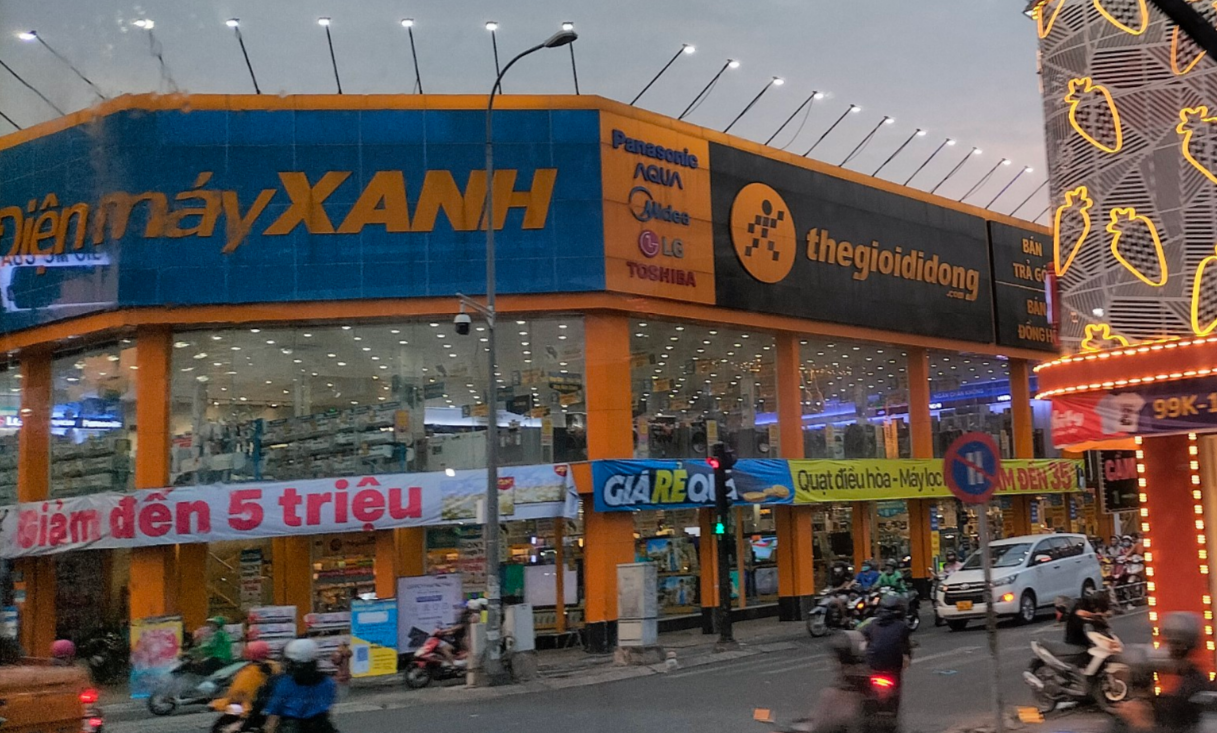
Thegioididong.com store in Gò Vấp, formerly place of the original Hạnh Thông Tây Market

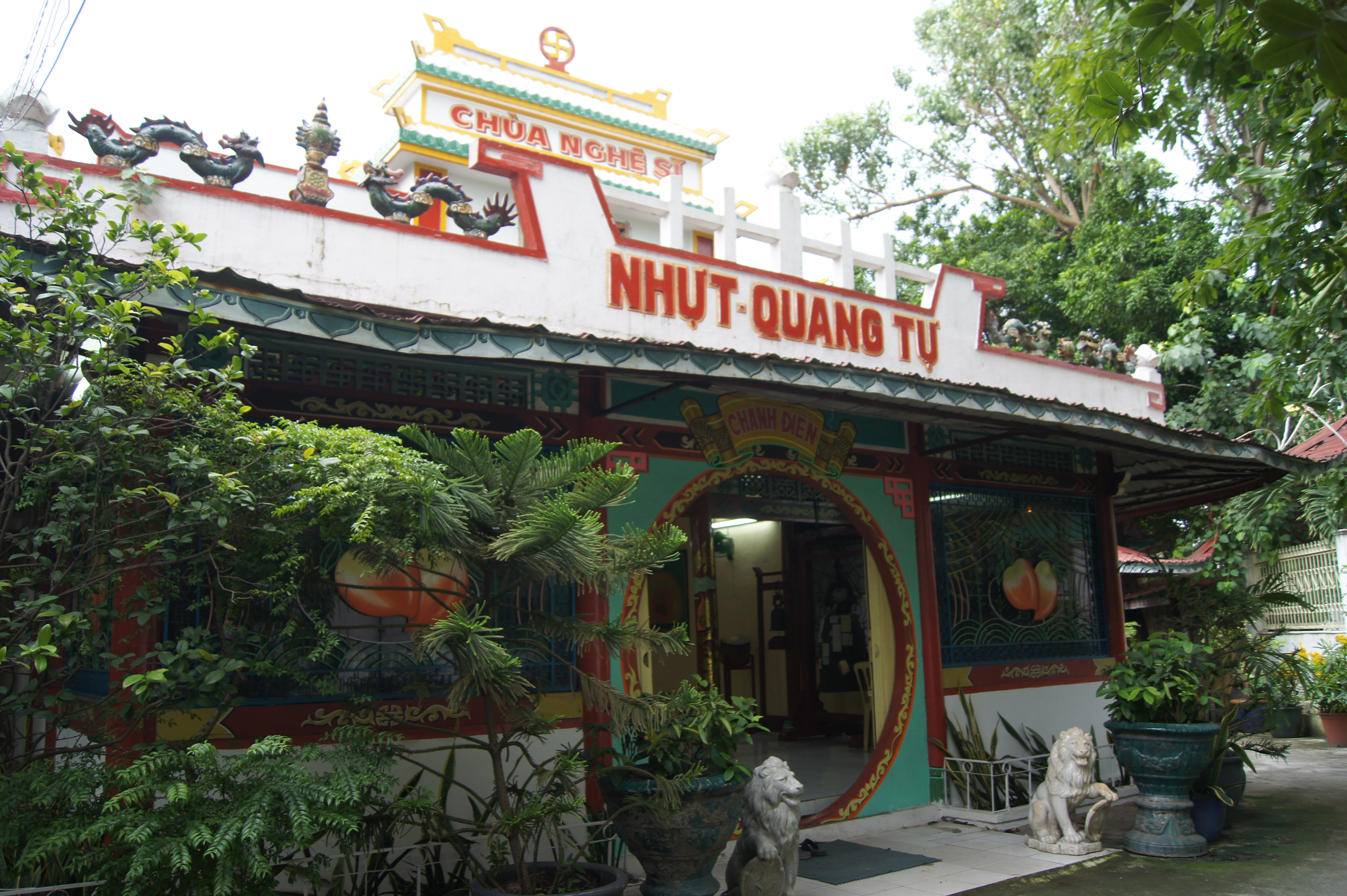
Nhựt Quang Temple – Pagoda of Artists

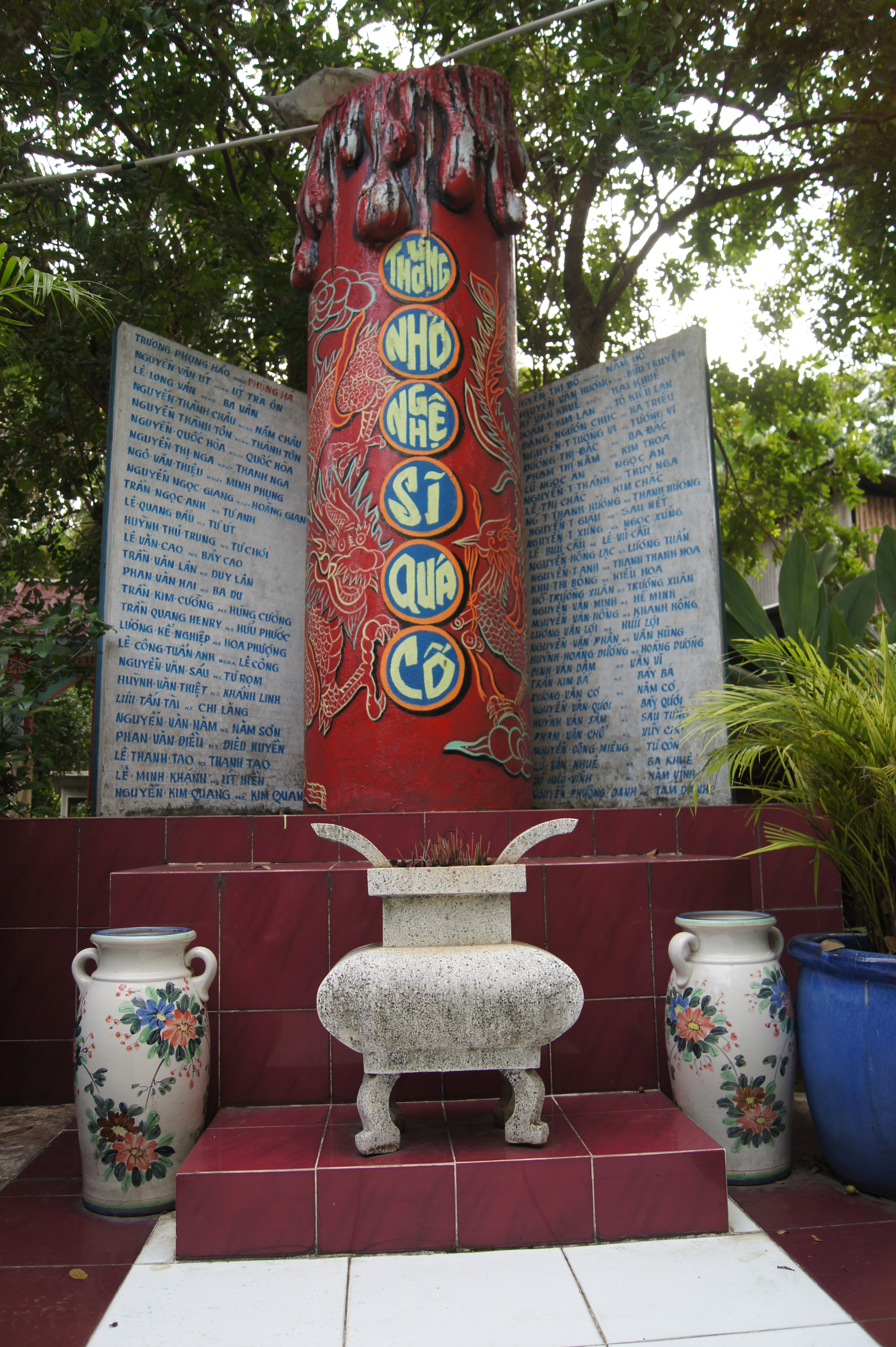
The memorial monument in the graveyard of Pagoda of Artists
