= An Nhơn, Ho Chi Minh City =

An Nhơn Phường An Nhơn
- Ward
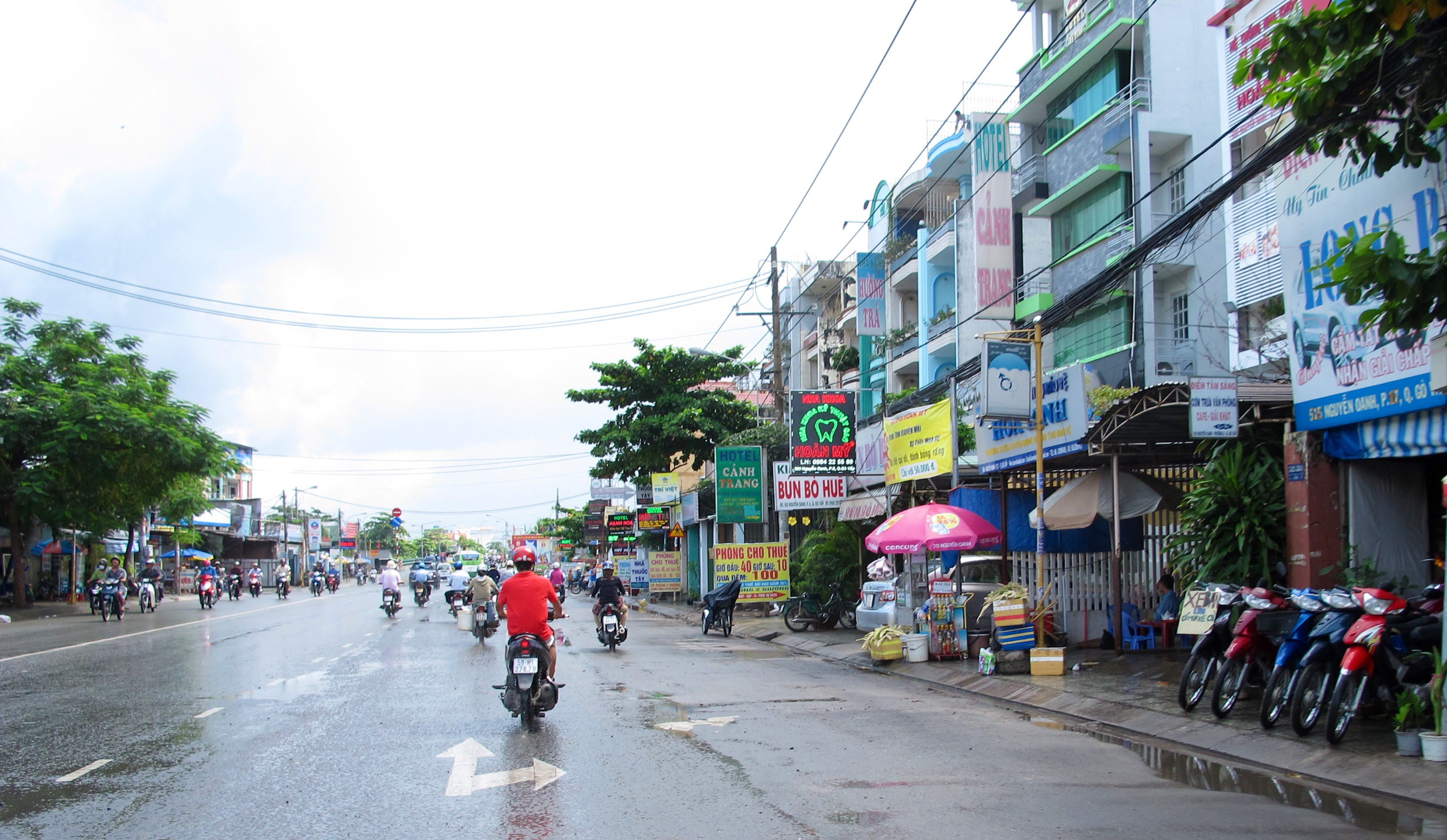
- Nguyễn Oanh Road in An Nhơn
- Interactive map of An Nhơn
- Coordinates: 10°50′10″N 106°41′08″E
- Country: Vietnam
- Municipality: Ho Chi Minh City
- Established: June 16, 2025

Area
  - Total: 1.25 sq mi (3.23 km^{2})

Population (2024)
  - Total: 111,498
  - Density: 89,400/sq mi (34,500/km^{2})
- Time zone: UTC+07:00 (Indochina Time)
- Administrative code: 26876

An Nhơn (Vietnamese: Phường An Nhơn) is a ward of Ho Chi Minh City, Vietnam. It is one of the 168 new wards, communes and special zones of the city following the reorganization in 2025.

== History ==
On June 16, 2025, the National Assembly Standing Committee issued Resolution No. 1685/NQ-UBTVQH15 on the arrangement of commune-level administrative units of Ho Chi Minh City in 2025 (effective from June 16, 2025). Accordingly, the entire land area and population of Ward 5 and Ward 6 of the former Gò Vấp district will be integrated into a new ward named An Nhơn (Clause 48, Article 1).

== Gallery ==
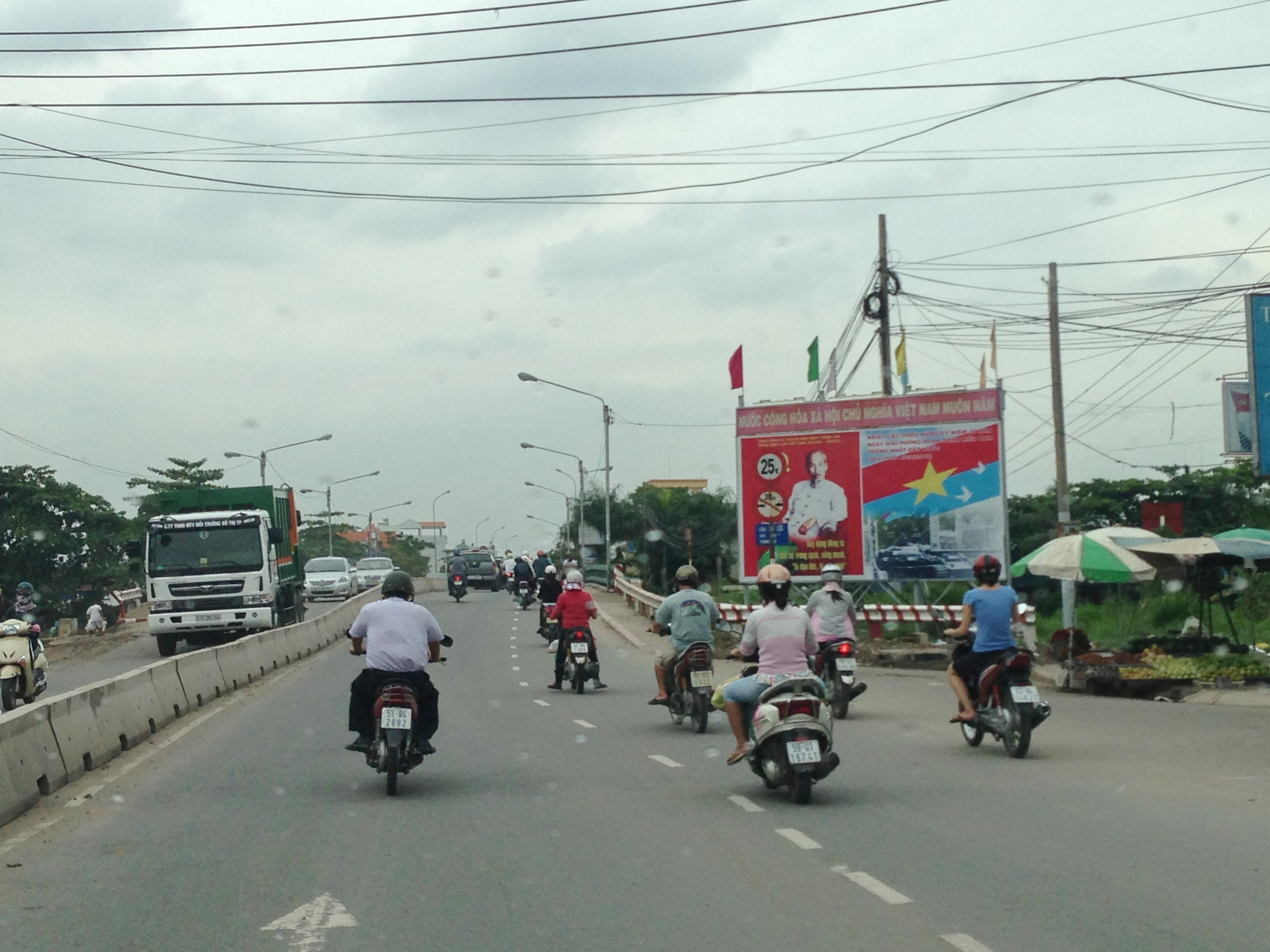
An Lộc Bridge, towards Ngã tư Ga in An Phú Đông, the borderline of An Nhơn with Gò Vấp ward

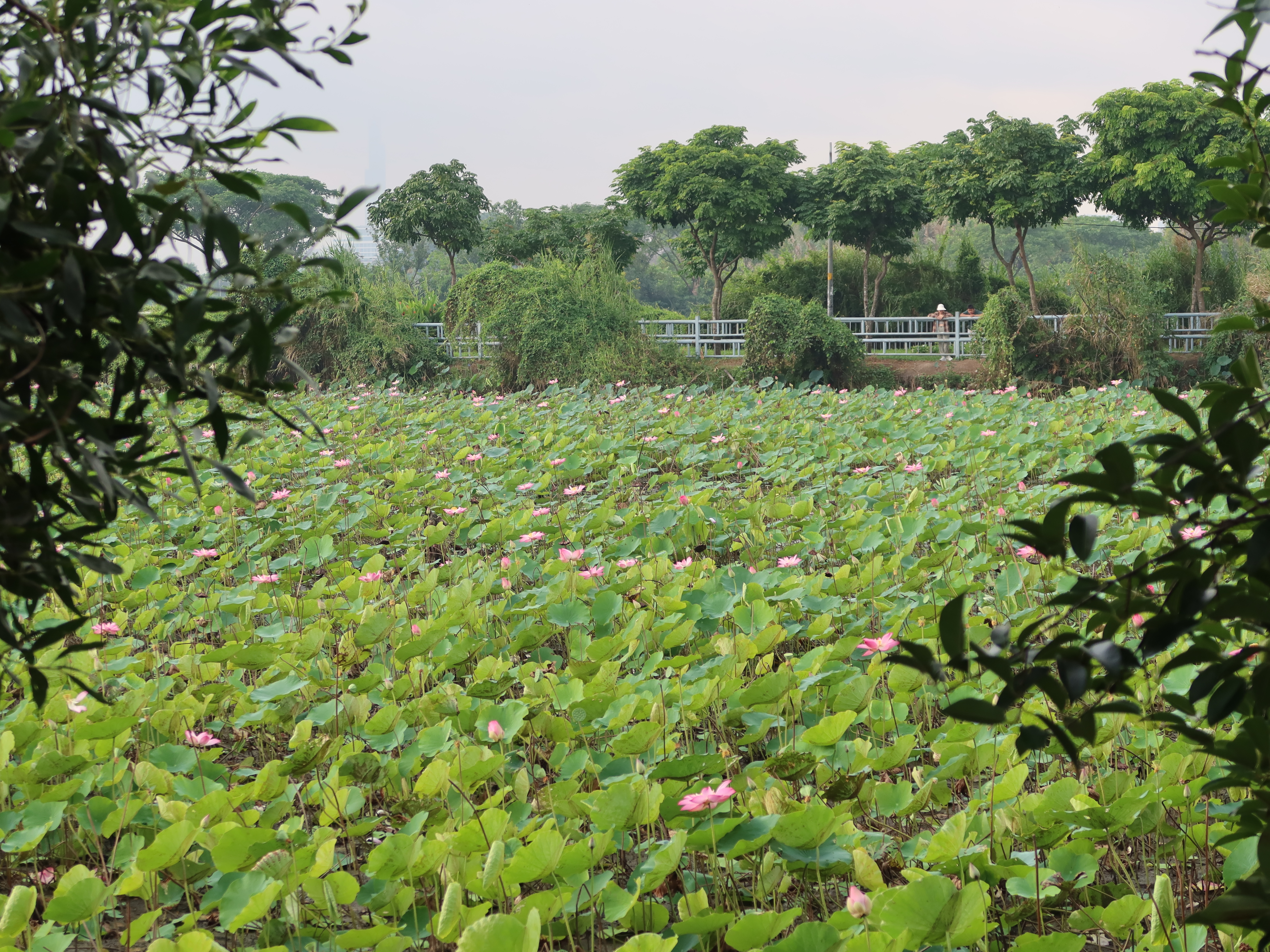
Gò Vấp Cultural Park with Lotus Flower flowing on the canal in the park

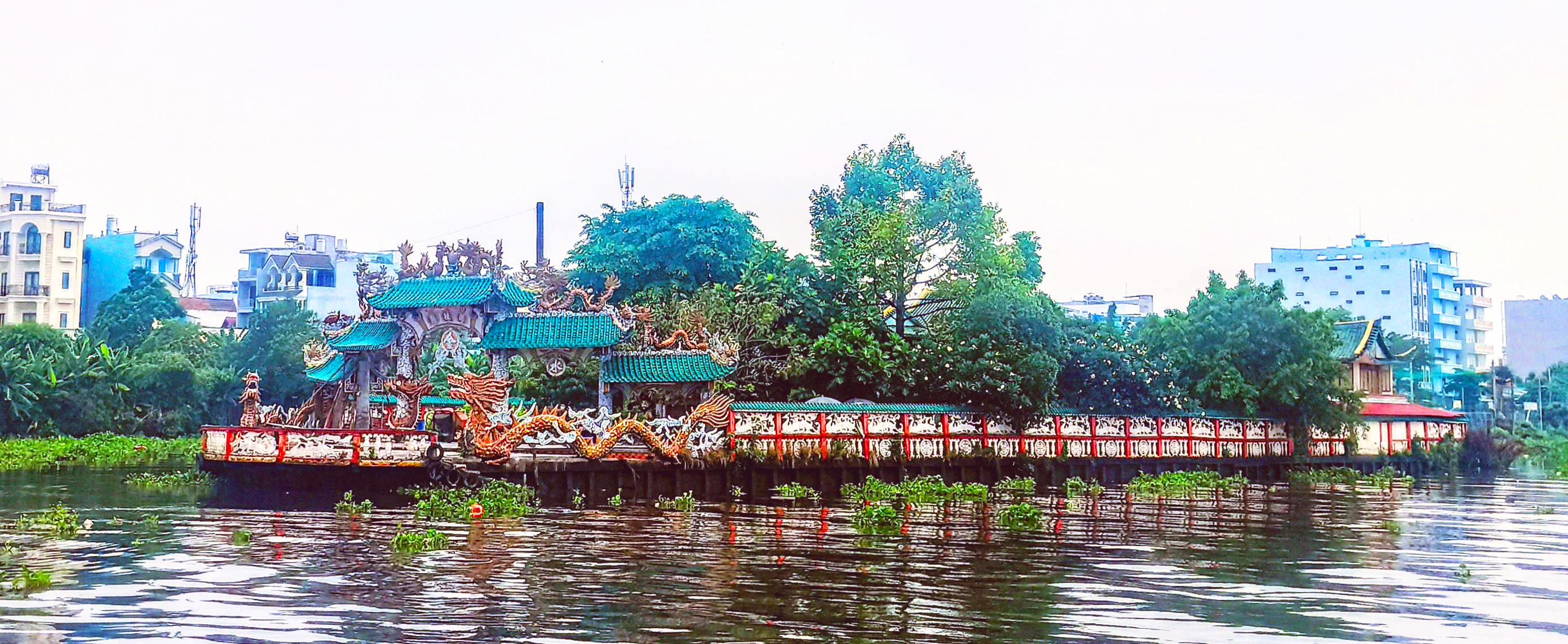
Phù Châu Floating Temple on Vàm Thuật River

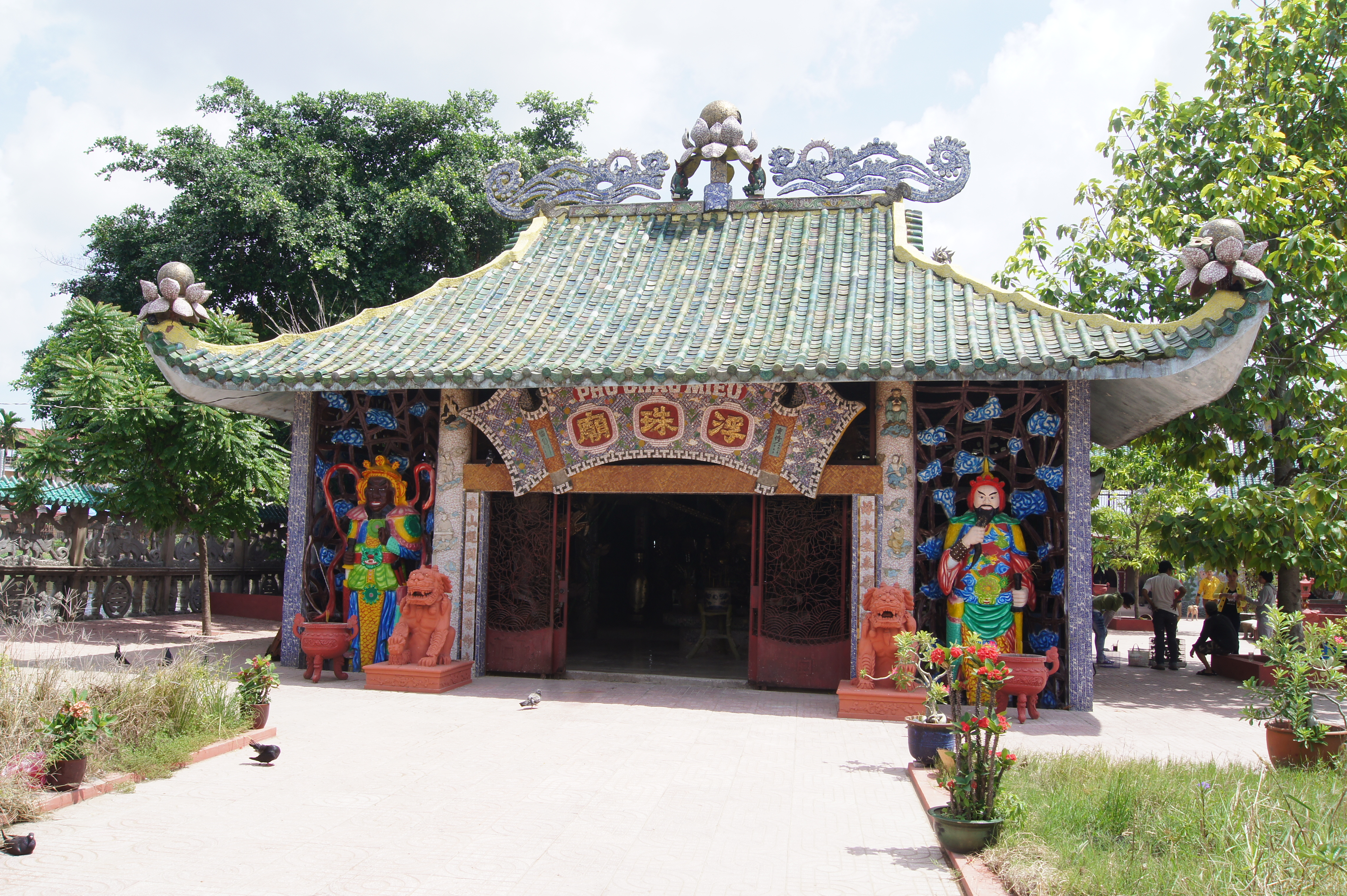
Front face of Floating Temple
