= Trang Tien Plaza =

Coordinates: 21°01′29″N 105°51′12″E

Tràng Tiền Plaza
- Cửa hàng Bách hóa Tổng hợp Tràng Tiền
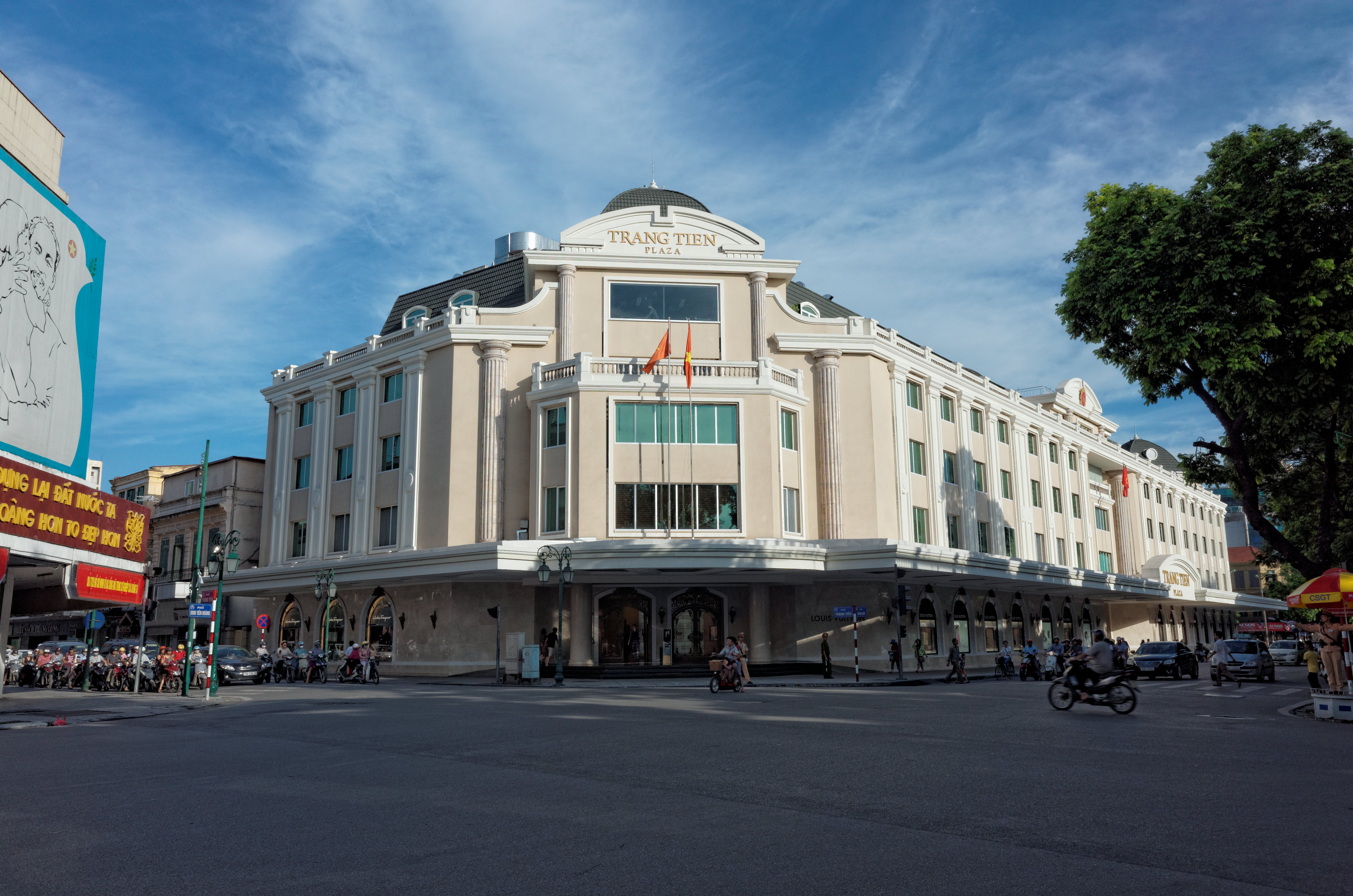
- Location: Tràng Tiền, Hoàn Kiếm district, Hanoi, Vietnam
- Address: 24 Hai Bà Trưng Street, Cửa Nam
- Opened: 2001
- Previous names: Tràng Tiền Department Store
- Developer: Vinaconex
- Floor area: 20,000 m^{2} (220,000 sq ft)
- Floors: 6
- Website: trangtienplaza.net

Tràng Tiền Plaza or also known as Tràng Tiền Department Store (Vietnamese: Cửa hàng Bách hóa Tổng hợp Tràng Tiền) is a department store with 3 facades located on streets of Tràng Tiền, Hàng Bài and Hai Bà Trưng in Hoàn Kiếm district, the downtown of Hanoi, Vietnam. The complex's construction began on April 30, 2000 as Vietnam celebrated the 25th anniversary of The liberation of the south of Vietnam. The complex was finished after 18 months of construction.

== Organization ==
Tràng Tiền Plaza is the first luxury shopping mall in Vietnam, it has more than 200 fashion brands, cosmetics, handbags, footwear and accessories. IPPG is the primary management and distribution entity at Tràng Tiền Plaza through its subsidiaries such as DAFC and ACFC, alongside other large independent distributors like Tam Sơn (Openasia) and international brands that operate their own stores. There are over 50 leading international brands and most of the top 10 brands in the world fashion: Burberry, Cartier, Louis Vuitton, Rolex...Tràng Tiền Plaza offers more than 215,000 square feet (20,000 sqm) space for offices, retail shops, coffee and food outlets.

Floor	Use	Tenants
6	Kids and Home living	Unknown
5	Fine dining and Entertainment	CGV Cinema, Eggyolk Coffee, Gogi House, I-Museum, Kichi-Kichi
4	Jewelry & Lifestyle, Men's Fashion, Leather, Sport, Women's Fashion and Lingerie	Barishidi, ECCO, Giovanni, Himalaya, Kenneth, Kim Hương, Lare Boss, Mipa Golf Maison, Nike, Pleats Kora, Prima Art, Rockport, Samsonite, San-Kelloff, Triumph, Valentino Creations, Hoji Tea House
3	Cosmetics, Fine Jewelry and fashions	Alex Simone, Armani Exchange, Banana Republic , Calvin Klein, Casamorati, Chapel Factory, Donghochinhhang.com, Erbario Toscano, Erbaviva, GAP, Gellé Frères, Gri Gri, Guess, Hazzys, Isabey Parfums, Issey Miyake, Jacques Fath Paris, Jardins D’écrivains Paris, Kanebo, Lancôme, Long Beach Pearl, Maestro, Maitre Parfumeur et Gantier, Narciso Rodriguez, Polo Ralph Lauren, Smith’s Rosebud, Swarovski, The Merchant of Venice, Tommy Hilfiger, Tory Burch, Valmont, Versace Jeans Couture
2	Luxury fashion brands with Jewelry & Accessories	Alessandra Rich, Aquazzura, Balmain, Brooks Brothers, Burberry, Casadei, Elisabetta Franchi, Emporio Armani, Ermenegildo Zegna, Gianvito Rossi, Jess Luxury Eyewear, Monaco, MCM, Moschino, Oscar de la Renta, Paul & Shark, Roberto Cavalli, Santoni, Tumi, Versace, Zimmermann, Zuhair Murad
1	Luxury fashion and lifestyle brands, Fine Jewelry, Watches	Cartier, Christian Louboutin, Dolce & Gabbana, Gucci, Hublot ,Montblanc, Rolex, Salvatore Ferragamo, Stefano Ricci Tiffany & Co., Versace

Floor 1

Floor 2

Floor 3

Floor 4

Entrance hall at 1F
