= Escalator school =

School that offers education from primary or middle until university

An escalator school (エスカレーター学校, esukareitā gakkō) (also esukareitā kō (エスカレーター校) and esukareita kō (エスカレータ校)) is an educational school that offers education from elementary or middle (or even from the kindergarten) until university. Escalator schools are so called because students usually rise to the next grade without having to take entrance exams. While many Western private schools are this way, escalator schools are far more prevalent in Japan and in the Philippines than in other countries.

Escalator schools are commonly found in anime and manga, as they are a quick and easy realistical explanation for having characters of very different ages in the same school-like setting.

== Examples in pop culture ==
- Eitoku Academy in Boys Over Flowers.
- CLAMP Academy in CLAMP School Detectives.
- Sayaka Kudo's high school in Flying Colors.
- Kuoh Academy in High School DxD.
- Saki Girls' School in Joshi Kousei.
- Mahora Academy in Mahou Sensei Negima.
- Ouran Academy in Ouran High School Host Club.
- Ohtori Academy in Revolutionary Girl Utena.
- Mugen Gakuen and T*A Private Girls School in Sailor Moon.
  - T*A Private Girls School is based on the real-world escalator school Toyo Eiwa Jogakuin.
- Xavier's School for Gifted Youngsters/Xavier Academy in the comic book, cartoon, and theatrical versions of the X-Men. Xavier's "escalator" goes one step higher, since most of the instructors are former students who seamlessly moved into their new roles.

== See also ==
- All-through school
- Dual degree
- Educational stage
- K–12
