= Ahd Party =

Jordanian political party

Symbol of the party

Ahd Party (Arabic: حزب العهد) is a Jordanian political party. The general secretary of the party as of some years ago was Khaldun an-Nasr.

== See also ==
- List of political parties in Jordan
