= Casadei (brand) =

Italian luxury footwear brand founded in 1958

- Type: Private
- Industry: Luxury goods, Fashion accessories, Footwear
- Founded: 1958
- Founders: Quinto Casadei; Flora Casadei
- Headquarters: San Mauro Pascoli, Province of Forlì-Cesena, Italy
- Area served: Worldwide
- Key people: Cesare Casadei (Creative Director); Arianna Casadei (CEO / General Manager)
- Products: Women's footwear, handbags
- Website: casadei.com

Casadei (officially Calzaturificio Casadei) is an Italian luxury footwear company specializing in the production of women's handcrafted shoes. The company is best known internationally for its Blade heel, a sharp stiletto made of hardened steel, introduced in 2011–2012 by creative director Cesare Casadei.

== History ==
Casadei was founded in 1958 by Quinto Casadei and his wife Flora Casadei, along with Quinto's brothers Rino and Nando, as a small artisanal workshop in San Mauro Pascoli, a town in the Province of Forlì-Cesena. The company initially produced affordable heeled sandals for tourists visiting the Romagnola Riviera.

During the 1970s, Casadei launched its first advertising campaigns, began exporting to Japan, and in 1977 opened its first single-brand store in Brussels.

Quinto and Flora's son, Cesare Casadei (born 1962), joined the family business in 1987 and formally became creative director in 1994. In 2010, Casadei participated for the first time in Milan Fashion Week and opened new stores in Rome, Cannes, Dubai, Casablanca, and New York. In November 2015, Cesare Casadei and architect Marco Costanzi unveiled a new concept store format in Rome and Milan, and a new boutique in Mayfair, London.

In 2011–2012, Cesare Casadei introduced the Blade heel: a stiletto made of hardened stainless steel, engineered to be razor-thin yet structurally sound. The Blade was designed to be recognizable without a logo.

In 2015, the brand launched "Casadei Blade Bespoke," an exclusive customization service available through Harrods in London. In 2022, for the Blade's tenth anniversary, Casadei released a limited run of 1,000 wearable NFT shoes, designed with Web3 firm Another-1 and presented on the metaverse platform Decentraland in a project called "Casadei 3.0." In February 2020, during Milan Fashion Week, Casadei introduced the C-Chain, a graphic motif composed of two reversed letter "C"s linked by a ring to form a chain.

In January 2023, Arianna Casadei, daughter of Cesare and granddaughter of the founders, was appointed CEO and General Manager, representing the third generation of family leadership. Under her leadership, the company targeted revenues of 30 million euros for 2023, having recorded 20 percent sales growth in 2022.

== Collaborations ==
In 2019, as part of Italian sole manufacturer Vibram's #WHYVIBRAM initiative, the two companies produced a high-performance technical sneaker reinterpreted through Casadei's aesthetic. That same year, Casadei also partnered with the Ethical Fashion Initiative, a programme of the United Nations' International Trade Centre, to produce a capsule collection for Spring/Summer 2020 involving weavers from Burkina Faso. In 2023, under the direction of General Manager Arianna Casadei, the brand produced a capsule collection of 24 sustainable tote bag models in 100% recycled yarn for Agora, the green boutique of the Six Senses resort complex in Ibiza.

In 2025, Casadei collaborated with designer Alessandro Enriquez for the Spring/Summer 2026 season, producing a capsule collection that combined Casadei's artisanal savoir-faire with Enriquez's pop sensibility. Also in 2025, Casadei and New York bridal designer House of Gilles unveiled an exclusive bridal footwear collection, featuring duchess satin pleating, botanical appliqués, and lace embellished with embroidery and crystals, uniting the House of Gilles bridal aesthetic with Casadei's signature silhouettes. In the same year, Casadei renewed its partnership with Swiss high-jewelry house Chopard at the Cannes Film Festival for the third consecutive year, presenting custom-made models for the festival's official gala evening.

== See also ==
- San Mauro Pascoli
- Made in Italy
- Giuseppe Zanotti
