= Thới An =

Thới An Phường Thới An Thạnh Xuân, Quới Xuân
- Ward
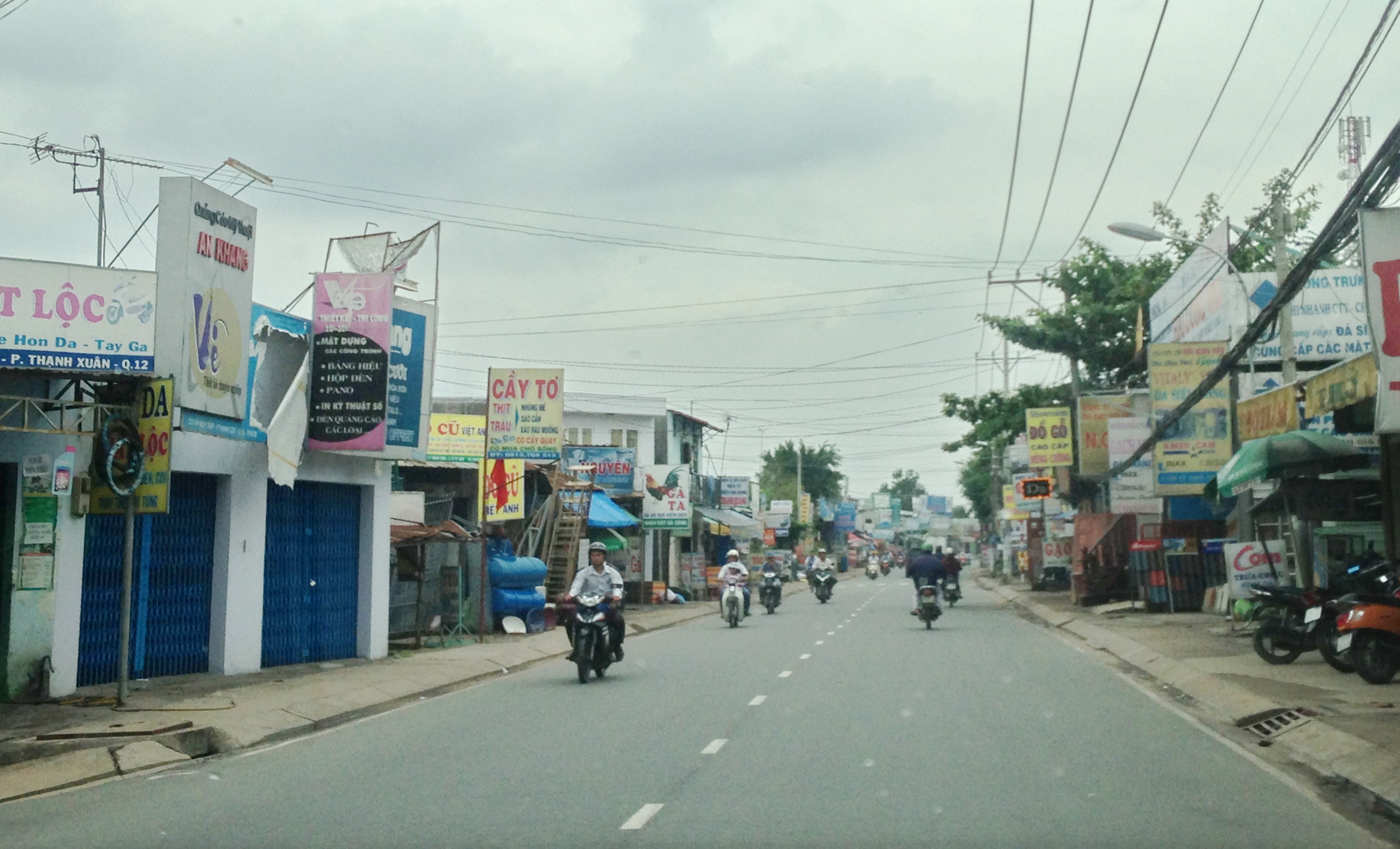
- Hà Huy Giáp Road
- Interactive map of Thới An
- Coordinates: 10°52′22″N 106°39′16″E
- Country: Vietnam
- Municipality: Ho Chi Minh City
- Established: June 16, 2025

Area
  - Total: 5.75 sq mi (14.90 km^{2})

Population (2024)
  - Total: 125,657
  - Density: 21,840/sq mi (8,433/km^{2})
- Time zone: UTC+07:00 (Indochina Time)
- Administrative code: 26773

Thới An (Vietnamese: Phường Thới An) is a ward of Ho Chi Minh City, Vietnam. It is one of the 168 new wards, communes and special zones of the city following the reorganization in 2025.

== History ==
On June 16, 2025, the National Assembly Standing Committee issued Resolution No. 1685/NQ-UBTVQH15 on the arrangement of commune-level administrative units of Ho Chi Minh City in 2025 (effective from June 16, 2025). Accordingly, the entire land area and population of Thạnh Xuân and Thới An wards of the former District 12 will be integrated into a new ward named Thới An (Clause 35, Article 1).
