= Tân Sơn, Ho Chi Minh City =

Tân Sơn Phường Tân Sơn Tân Trụ
- Ward
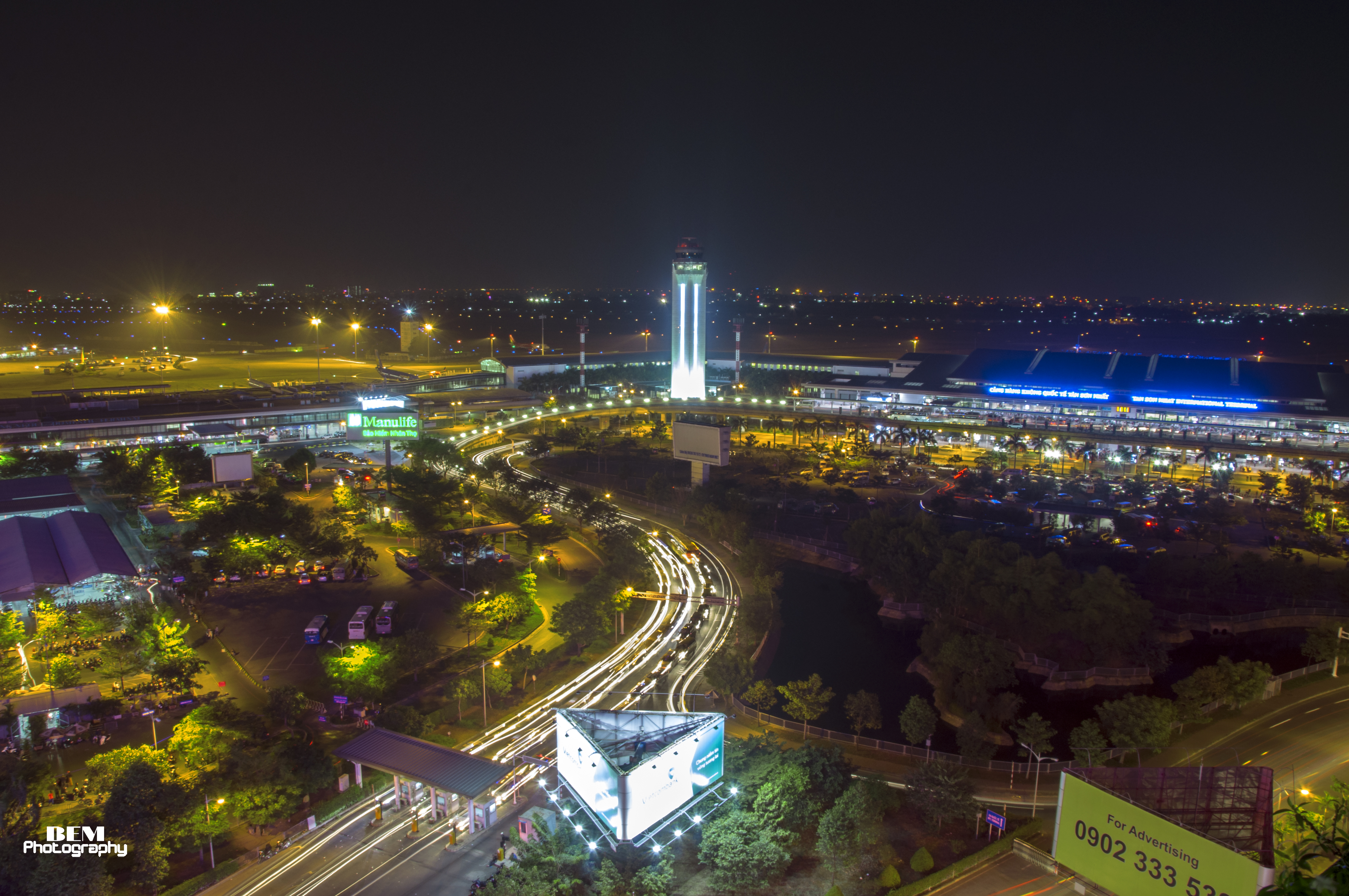
- Tan Son Nhat International Airport
- Interactive map of Tân Sơn
- Coordinates: 10°49′6.87″N 106°37′59.57″E
- Country: Vietnam
- Municipality: Ho Chi Minh City
- Established: June 16, 2025

Area
  - Total: 3.91 sq mi (10.12 km^{2})

Population (2024)
  - Total: 77,229
  - Density: 19,770/sq mi (7,631/km^{2})
- Time zone: UTC+07:00 (Indochina Time)
- Administrative code: 27007

Tân Sơn (Vietnamese: Phường Tân Sơn) is a ward of Ho Chi Minh City, Vietnam. It is one of the 168 new wards, communes and special zones of the city following the reorganization in 2025.

Most of the ward's land area is located within the Tân Sơn Nhất International Airport.

== Administration ==
Tân Sơn is divided into 31 neighborhoods: 1, 2, 3, 4, 5, 6, 7, 8, 9, 10, 11, 12, 13, 14, 15, 16, 17, 18, 19, 20, 21, 22, 23, 24, 25, 26, 27, 28, 29, 30, 31.

== History ==
On June 16, 2025, the National Assembly Standing Committee issued Resolution No. 1685/NQ-UBTVQH15 on the arrangement of commune-level administrative units of Ho Chi Minh City in 2025 (effective from June 16, 2025). Accordingly, the majority of land area and population of Ward 15 of the former Tân Bình district will be integrated into a new ward named Tân Sơn (Clause 61, Article 1).
