= Gò Vấp district =

Gò Vấp district Quận Gò Vấp
- Urban district
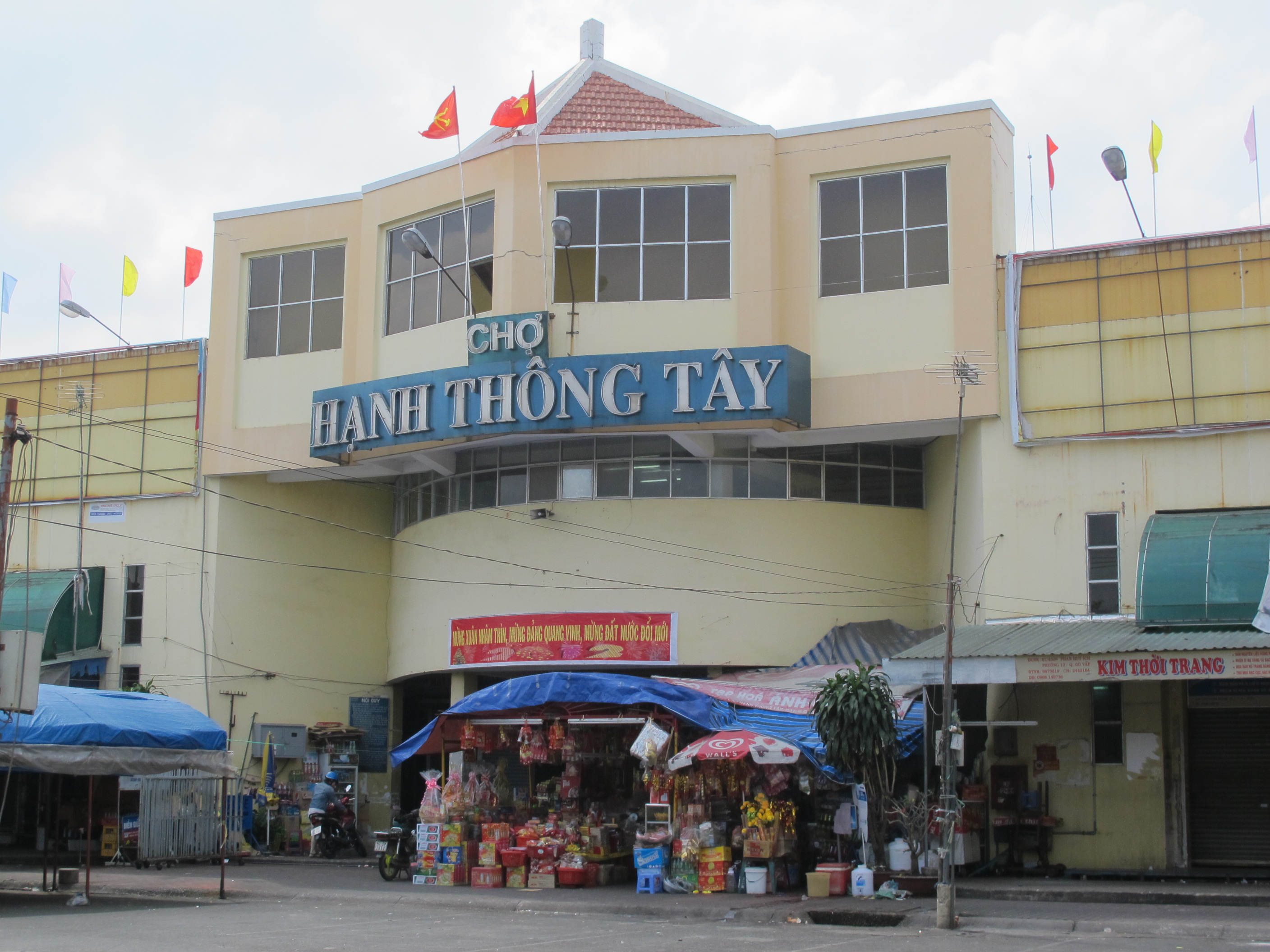
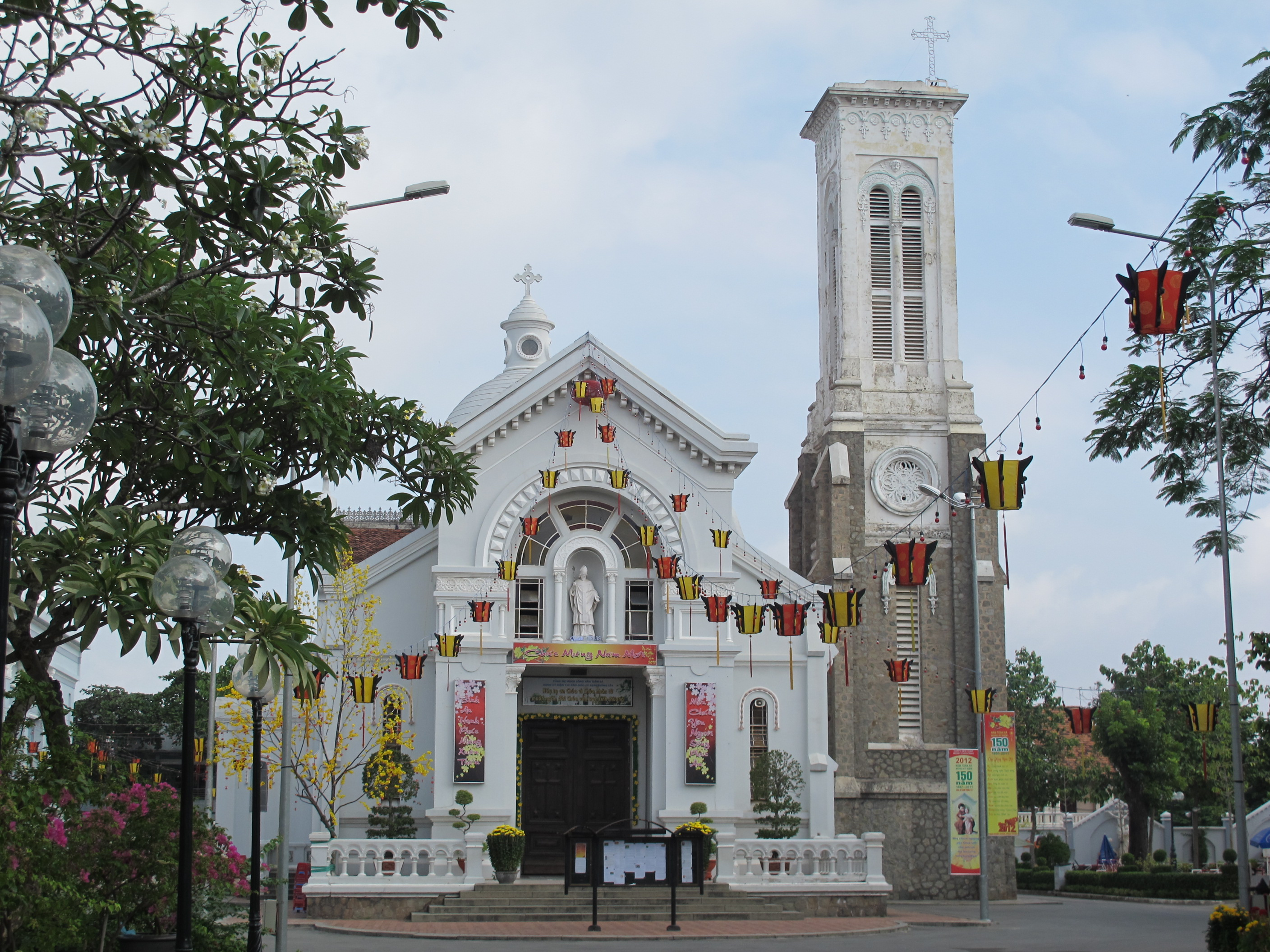
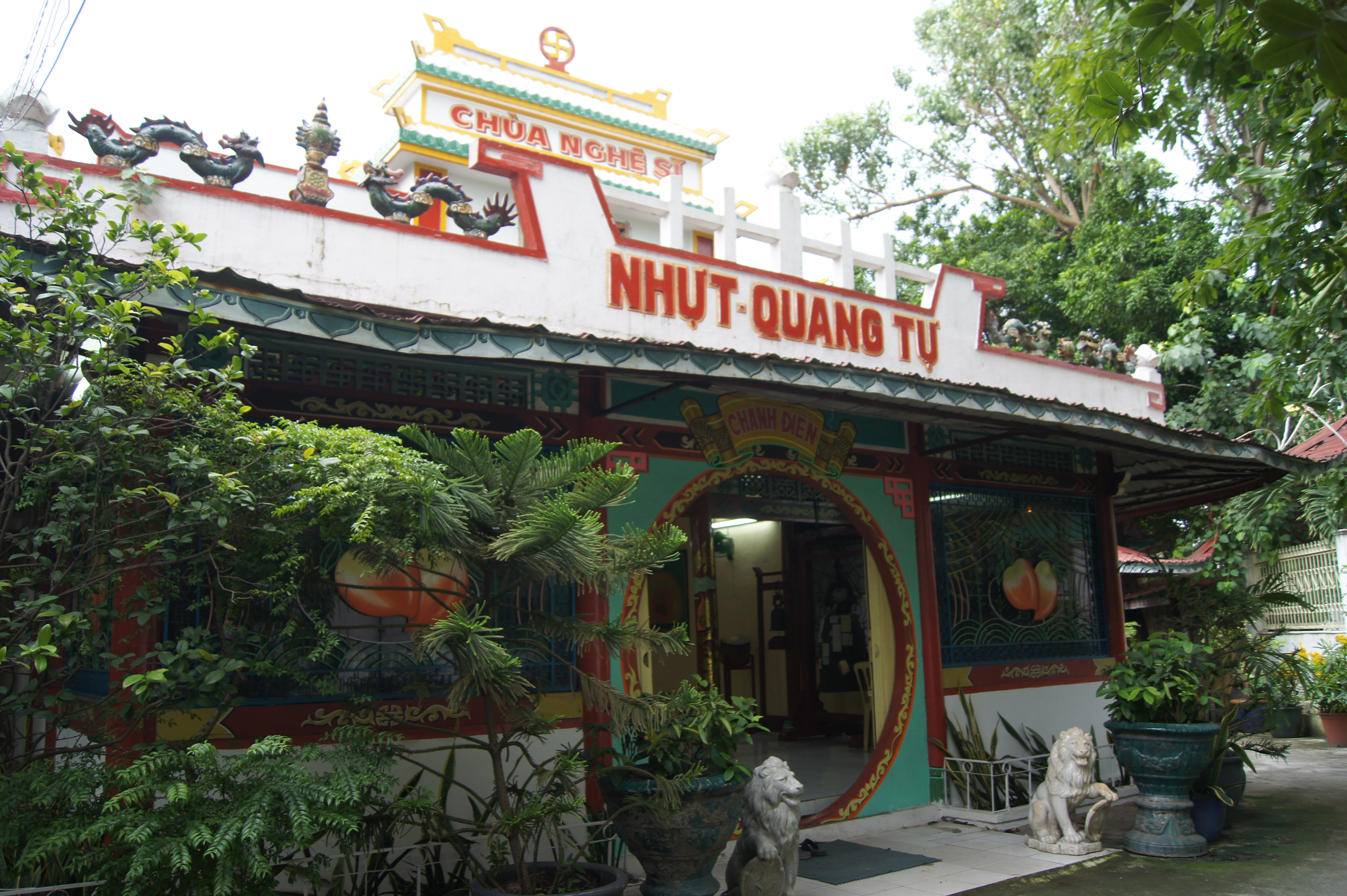
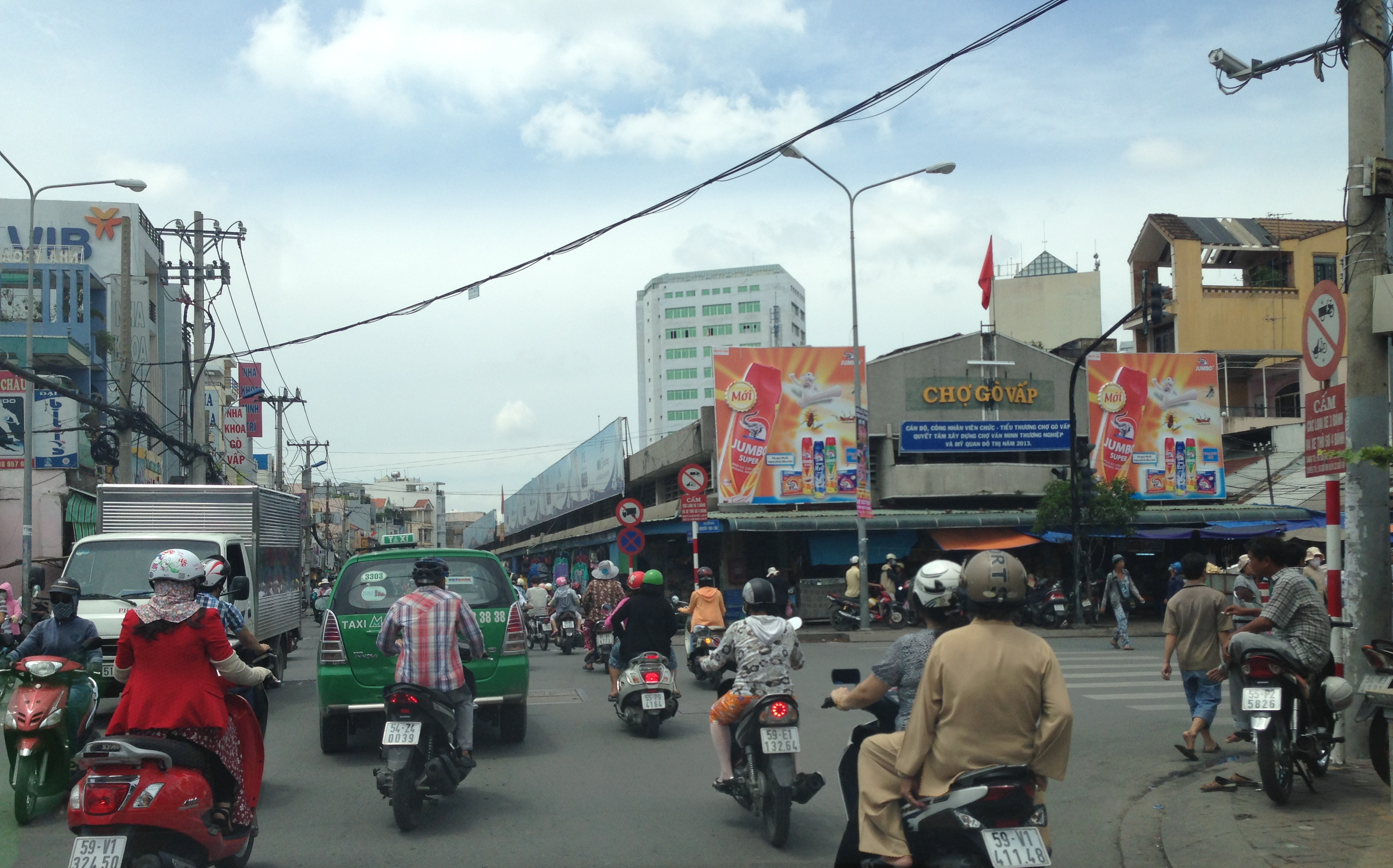
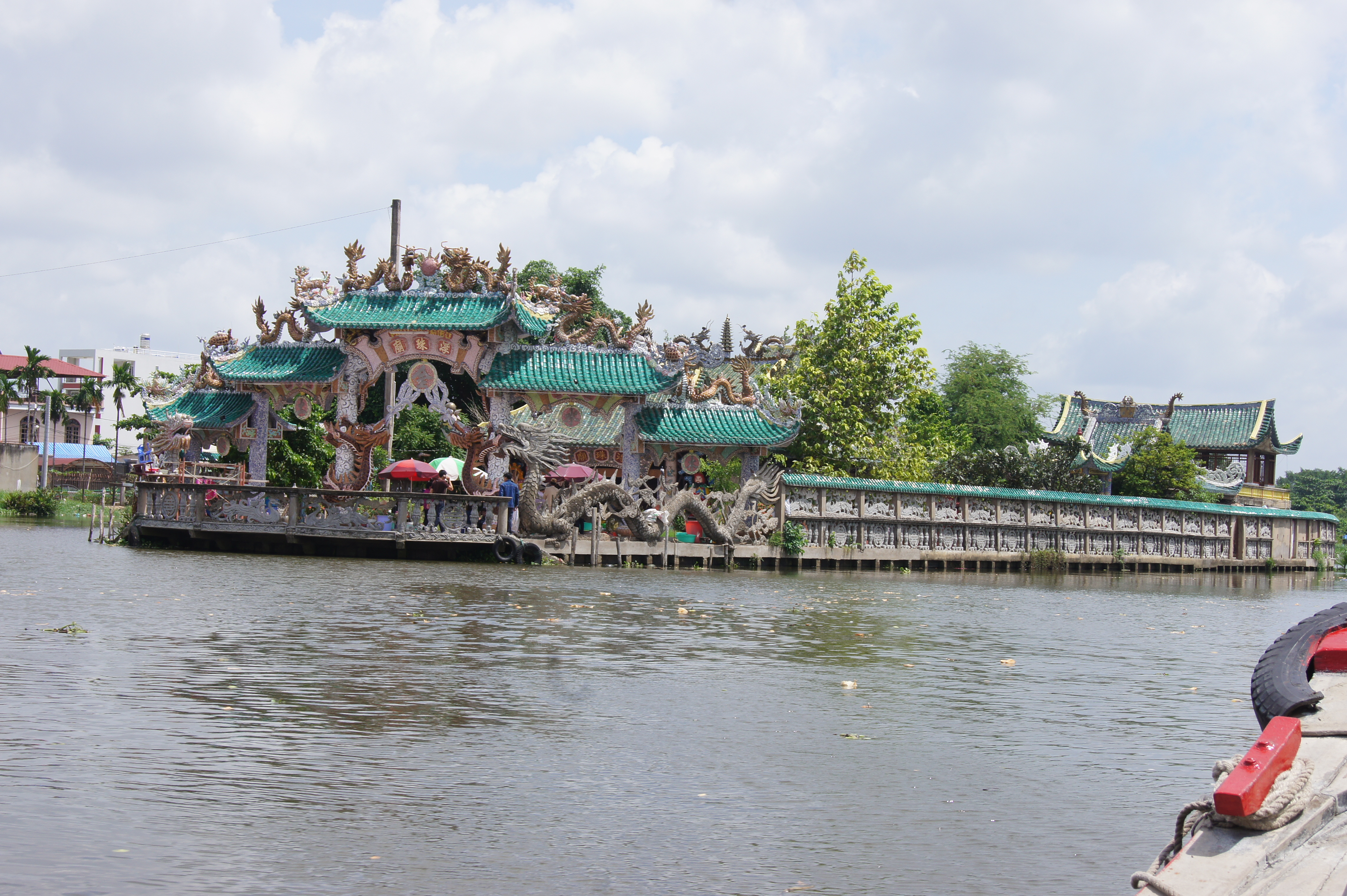
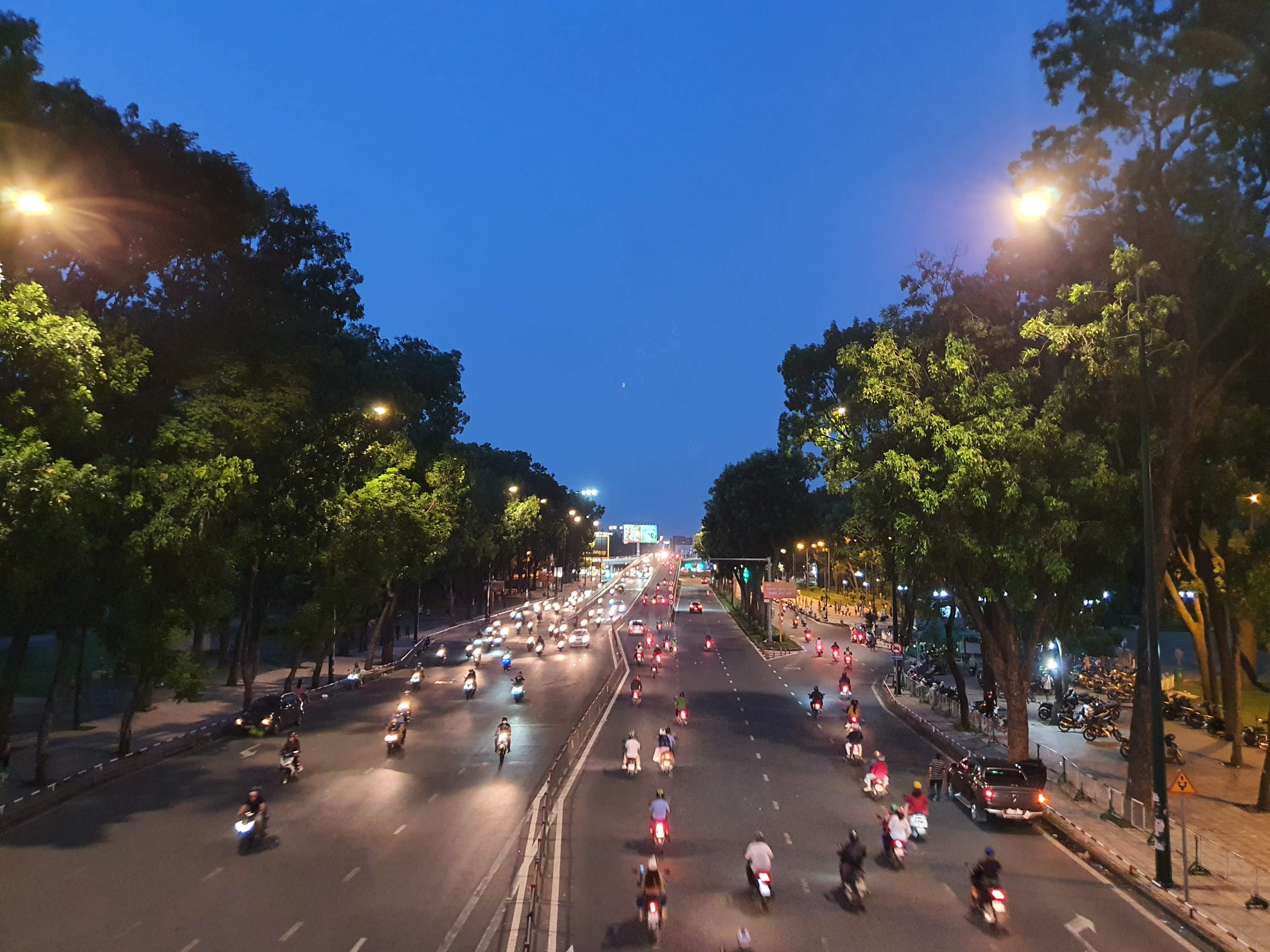
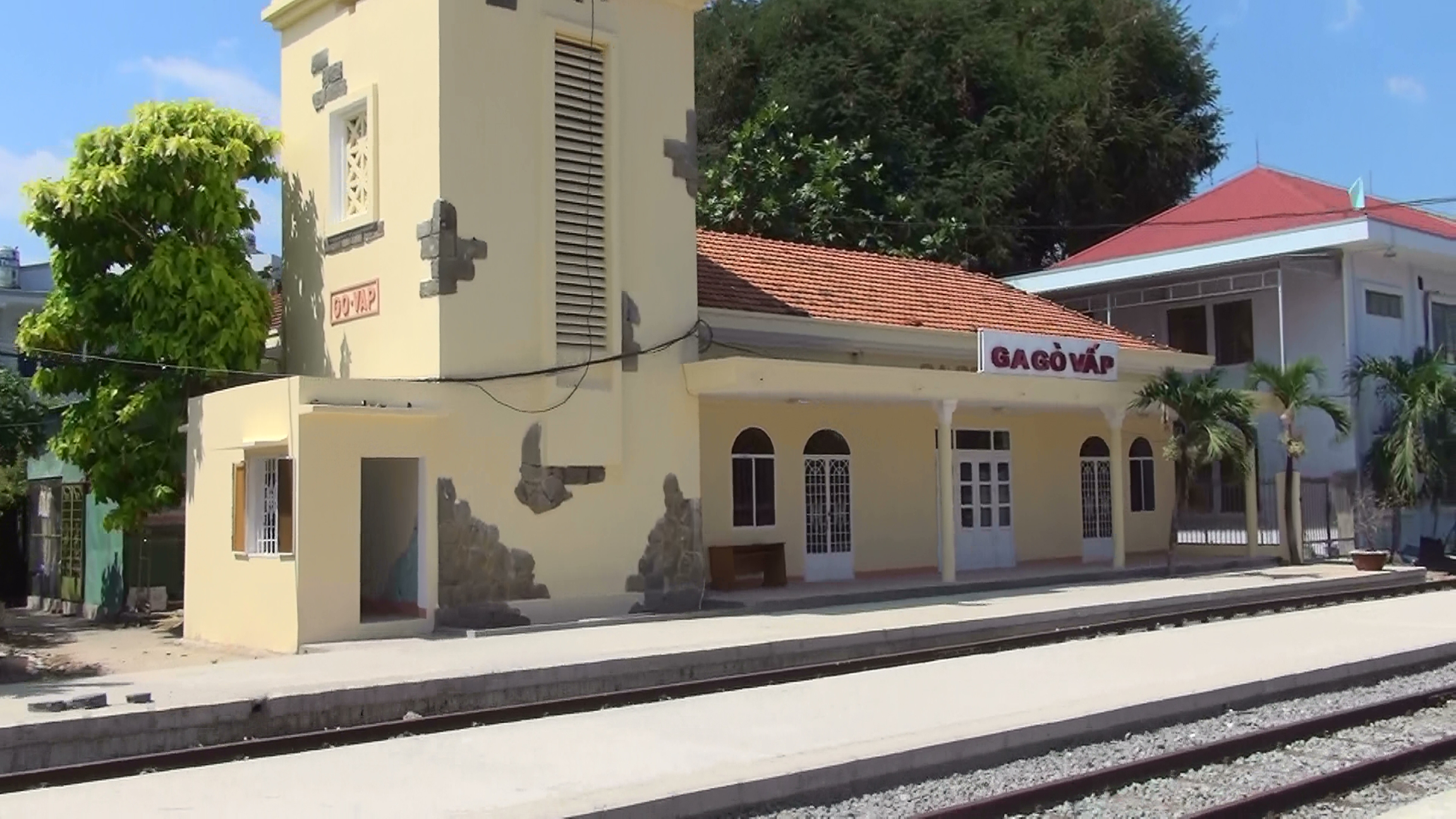
- From left to right, top to bottom: Hạnh Thông Tây Market, Hạnh Thông Tây Church, Nhựt Quang Temple (Temple of Artists), Gò Vấp Market with Industry University of Ho Chi Minh City behind in the middle, Phù Châu Floating Temple, Gia Định Park, Gò Vấp station

- Seal

- Position in HCMC's core

- Location within Vietnam
- Coordinates: 10°50′30″N 106°40′00″E
- Country: Vietnam
- Centrally governed city: Ho Chi Minh City
- District hall: 332 Quang Trung avenue, Ward 10
- Wards: 12 wards

Area
  - Total: 20 km^{2} (7.7 sq mi)

Population (2024)
  - Total: 763,313
  - Density: 38,000/km^{2} (99,000/sq mi)

Demographics
  - Main ethnic groups: predominantly Kinh
- Time zone: UTC+07 (ICT)
- Website: govap.hochiminhcity.gov.vn

Gò Vấp [ɣɔ˨˩:jəp˧˥] is a former urban district of Ho Chi Minh City that ceased to exist in July 1st 2025.

== History ==
Historically, Gò Vấp was part of Gia Định province until 1976, when the province was annexed to the city of Saigon and renamed into Ho Chi Minh City.

In July 1976, two wards (Bình Hòa and Thạnh Mỹ Tây) split from Gò Vấp District to create the new Bình Thạnh district. Later, the communes of Bình Mỹ joined Củ Chi district, and Nhị Bình, Tân Thới Hiệp, Thạnh Lộc and An Phú Đông joined Hóc Môn district (the two latter were split to create the District 12). Gò Vấp District was consists of 16 wards—1, 3, 4, 5, 6, 7, 8, 9, 10, 11, 12, 13, 14, 15, 16 and 17. Until 2025, when some wards were dissolved and merged into the other wards nearby, including: 4 and 7 into 1, 9 into 8, 13 into 14 and 15. The district has 12 wards tally.

Since the 1980s, Gò Vấp has undergone significant urbanization. It is more populous than most of the other districts.

A high urbanization rate has made Gò Vấp become one of the three districts that has high population growth in the city. Specifically, Gò Vấp had 144,000 people in 1976, and the population increased to 223,000 people in 1995, 231,000 people in 2000, 413,000 people in 2003, and 455,000 people in 2004. From 1980 to 2003, the population of Gò Vấp increased to nearly 3 times its population, and on average, increased 13.66% annually. According to the population census in 2017, the population of Gò Vấp was 663,313 people, the second-most population among other districts in Vietnam, right after Bình Tân district, also in Ho Chi Minh City.

== Geography ==
=== Topography ===
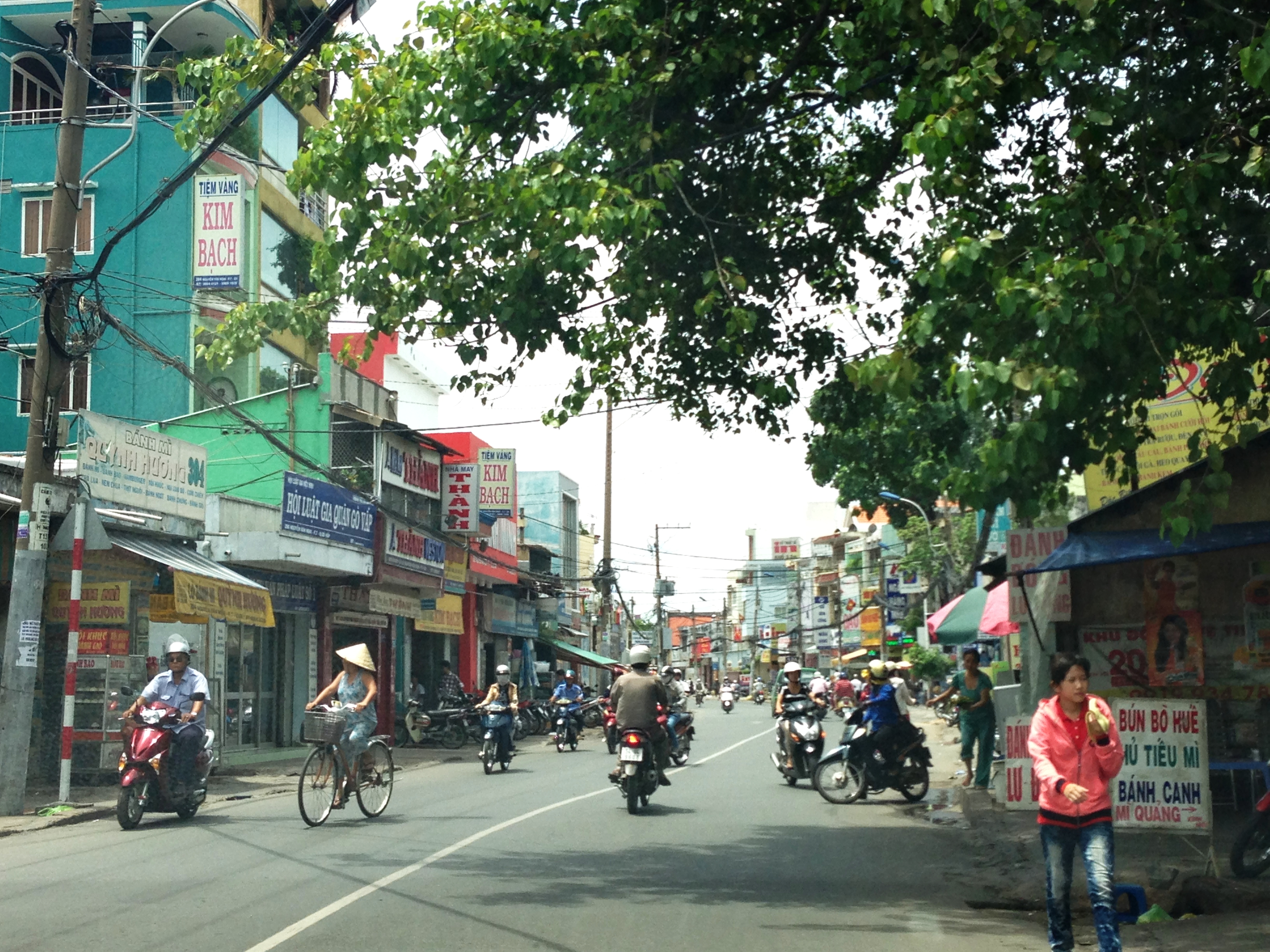
Nguyen Van Nghi street.

Gò Vấp is an urban district located in the north and northwest of Ho Chi Minh City, Vietnam. Gò Vấp borders with:

- Bình Thạnh District to the east
- Tân Bình District to the west mostly Tân Sơn Nhất Airporl wall
- Phú Nhuận District to the south
- District 12 to the north and northwest by Tham Lương - Bến Cát River

The total land area is 20 km^{2} (7.7 mi^{2}).

=== Population ===
According to the population census in 2017 of Ho Chi Minh City's Census Bureau, the district's population was 663,313 people, and the population density was 33,602 people per square kilometer. There are 8 ethnic groups in Gò Vấp, which are the Kinh people (98%), the Hoa people (1.8%), and the other 6 minor ethnic groups (0.2%).

== See also ==
- Bình Thạnh district
- Phú Nhuận district
- Tân Bình district
