= Ward 1 (Vietnam) =

Ward 1 (phường 1) may refer to several wards in Vietnam, including:

== Wards of Ho Chi Minh City ==
- Ward 1, District 3, a ward of District 3
- Ward 1, District 4, a ward of District 4
- Ward 1, District 5, a ward of District 5
- Ward 1, District 6, a ward of District 6
- Ward 1, District 8, a ward of District 8
- Ward 1, District 10, a ward of District 10
- Ward 1, District 11, a ward of District 11
- Ward 1, Bình Thạnh District, a ward of Bình Thạnh District
- Ward 1, Gò Vấp District, a ward of Gò Vấp District
- Ward 1, Phú Nhuận District, a ward of Phú Nhuận District
- Ward 1, Tân Bình District, a ward of Tân Bình District

== Wards of other provincial cities and district-level towns ==
- Ward 1, Vũng Tàu, a ward of Vũng Tàu
- Ward 1, Bạc Liêu, a ward of Bạc Liêu
- Ward 1, Cà Mau, a ward of Cà Mau
- Ward 1, Cao Lãnh, a ward of Cao Lãnh
- Ward 1, Sa Đéc, a ward of Sa Đéc
- Ward 1, Vị Thanh, a ward of Vị Thanh
- Ward 1, Bảo Lộc, a ward of Bảo Lộc
- Ward 1, Da Lat, a ward of Da Lat
- Ward 1, Tân An, a ward of Tân An
- Ward 1, Tuy Hòa, a ward of Tuy Hòa
- Ward 1, Đông Hà, a ward of Đông Hà
- Ward 1, Sóc Trăng, a ward of Sóc Trăng
- Ward 1, Tây Ninh, a ward of Tây Ninh
- Ward 1, Mỹ Tho, a ward of Mỹ Tho
- Ward 1, Trà Vinh, a ward of Trà Vinh
- Ward 1, Vĩnh Long, a ward of Vĩnh Long
- Ward 1, Giá Rai, a ward of Giá Rai
- Ward 1, Kiến Tường, a ward of Kiến Tường
- Ward 1, Quảng Trị, a ward of Quảng Trị
- Ward 1, Cai Lậy, a ward of Cai Lậy
- Ward 1, Gò Công, a ward of Gò Công
- Ward 1, Duyên Hải, a ward of Duyên Hải
