= First Ward =

First Ward can refer to:

- 1st Ward of New Orleans, a ward of New Orleans
- 1st ward, Chicago, an aldermanic ward of Chicago
- First Ward, Charlotte, a ward of Charlotte, North Carolina
- First Ward, Houston, a neighborhood of Houston
- Ward 1 of the District of Columbia, a ward of Washington, D.C.
- Ward 1, St. Louis City, an aldermanic ward of St. Louis
- Ward 1, the name of several wards of Zimbabwe
- Ward 1 (Vietnam) (disambiguation), name of several wards in Vietnam
- First Ward, Binghamton, a neighborhood in Binghamton, New York
- Orléans Ward, Ottawa (also known as Ward 1)
