= Đức Nhuận =

Đức Nhuận Phường Đức Nhuận Tây Nhứt, Đông Nhì
- Ward
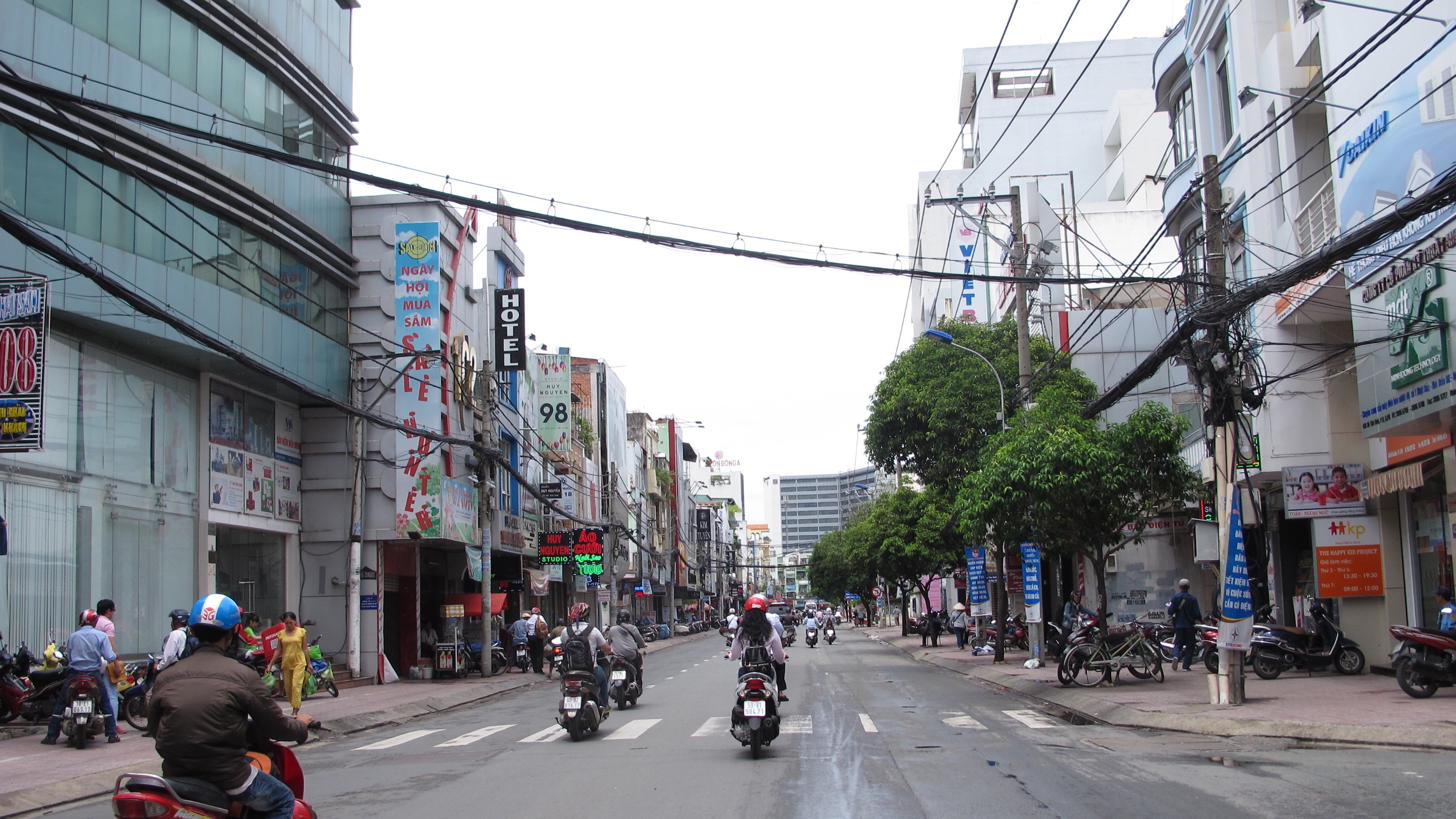
- Hồ Văn Huê Street
- Interactive map of Đức Nhuận
- Coordinates: 10°48′20.3″N 106°40′42.5″E
- Country: Vietnam
- Municipality: Ho Chi Minh City
- Established: June 16, 2025

Area
  - Total: 0.84 sq mi (2.17 km^{2})

Population (2024)
  - Total: 71,495
  - Density: 85,300/sq mi (32,900/km^{2})
- Time zone: UTC+07:00 (Indochina Time)
- Administrative code: 27043

Đức Nhuận (Vietnamese: Phường Đức Nhuận) is a ward of Ho Chi Minh City, Vietnam. It is one of the 168 new wards, communes and special zones of the city following the reorganization in 2025.

== Geography ==
Đức Nhuận ward is located in the north of the central core of Ho Chi Minh City, bordering:

- Gia Định wards to the east by Alley 40 Nguyễn Thượng Hiền and Lam Sơn Street;
- Hạnh Thông ward to the north;
- Bình Lợi Trung ward to the northeast by roads of Nguyễn Thượng Hiền Road and Nguyễn Văn Đậu;
- Tân Sơn Hòa ward to the west;
- Phú Nhuận and Cầu Kiệu wards to the south, separated by Hoàng Văn Thụ and Phan Đăng Lưu Street.

According to Official Dispatch No. 2896/BNV-CQĐP dated May 27, 2025 of the Ministry of Home Affairs, following the merger, Đức Nhuận ward has a land area of 2.17 km², the population as of December 31, 2024 is 71,495 people, the population density is 85,300 people/km².

== History ==
On June 16, 2025, the National Assembly Standing Committee issued Resolution No. 1685/NQ-UBTVQH15 on the arrangement of commune-level administrative units of Ho Chi Minh City in 2025 (effective from June 16, 2025). Accordingly, the entire land area and population of Ward 4, Ward 5 and Ward 9 of the former Phú Nhuận district will be integrated into a new ward named Đức Nhuận (Clause 53, Article 1).
