= Military Hospital 175 =

- Ministry of Defence

Geography
- Location: 786 Nguyễn Kiệm & 1 Nguyễn Thái Sơn, Hạnh Thông Ward, Ho Chi Minh City, Vietnam
- Coordinates: 10°49′07.8″N 106°40′48.4″E

Organisation
- Type: District

Services
- Emergency department: Yes

Helipads
- Helipad: Yes

History
- Founded: 26 May 1975; 51 years ago

Links
- Website: http://www.benhvien175.vn/
- Lists: Hospitals in Vietnam

Military Hospital 175 (Vietnamese: Bệnh viện Quân y 175) is the central hospital for the south region of the ministry of defense, located in Ho Chi Minh City, Vietnam. It was founded in 1975 by unifying a few military medical divisions and units, most notably K116, K72, and K59, initially to serve veterans and military officers after the Vietnam War. Over the years, it has been slowly opened to the general public and now also acts as a district hospital as well as a trauma center for the civilians.

== Current board of directors ==
- Director: Maj. Gen. Assoc. Prof. Nguyễn Hồng Sơn, Ph.D
- Vice director of general planning: Brig. Trần Quốc Việt, Ph.D
- Vice director of surgical departments: Brig. Trần Lê Đồng, Ph.D
- Vice director of medical departments: Brig. Trương Đình Cẩm, Ph.D
- Vice director of military: Brig. Trần Đức Thắng

== Notable departments and divisions ==
=== Cancer Diagnosis and Treatment Center ===
The Cancer Diagnosis and Treatment Center was established on September 15, 2012.

=== Bentiu Level 2 Hospital ===
In 2018, in supporting the United Nations Mission in South Sudan, UK Engineer Task Force had built a Level 2 Hospital in Bentiu, South Sudan while 175 hospital had deployed a Vietnamese Hospital unit consisted of 63-strong medical contingent to undertake Vietnam's first-ever UN peacekeeping mission. The first rotation is expected to last 18 month.
