= Tân Sơn Hòa =

Tân Sơn Hòa Phường Tân Sơn Hòa Thạnh Hòa
- Ward
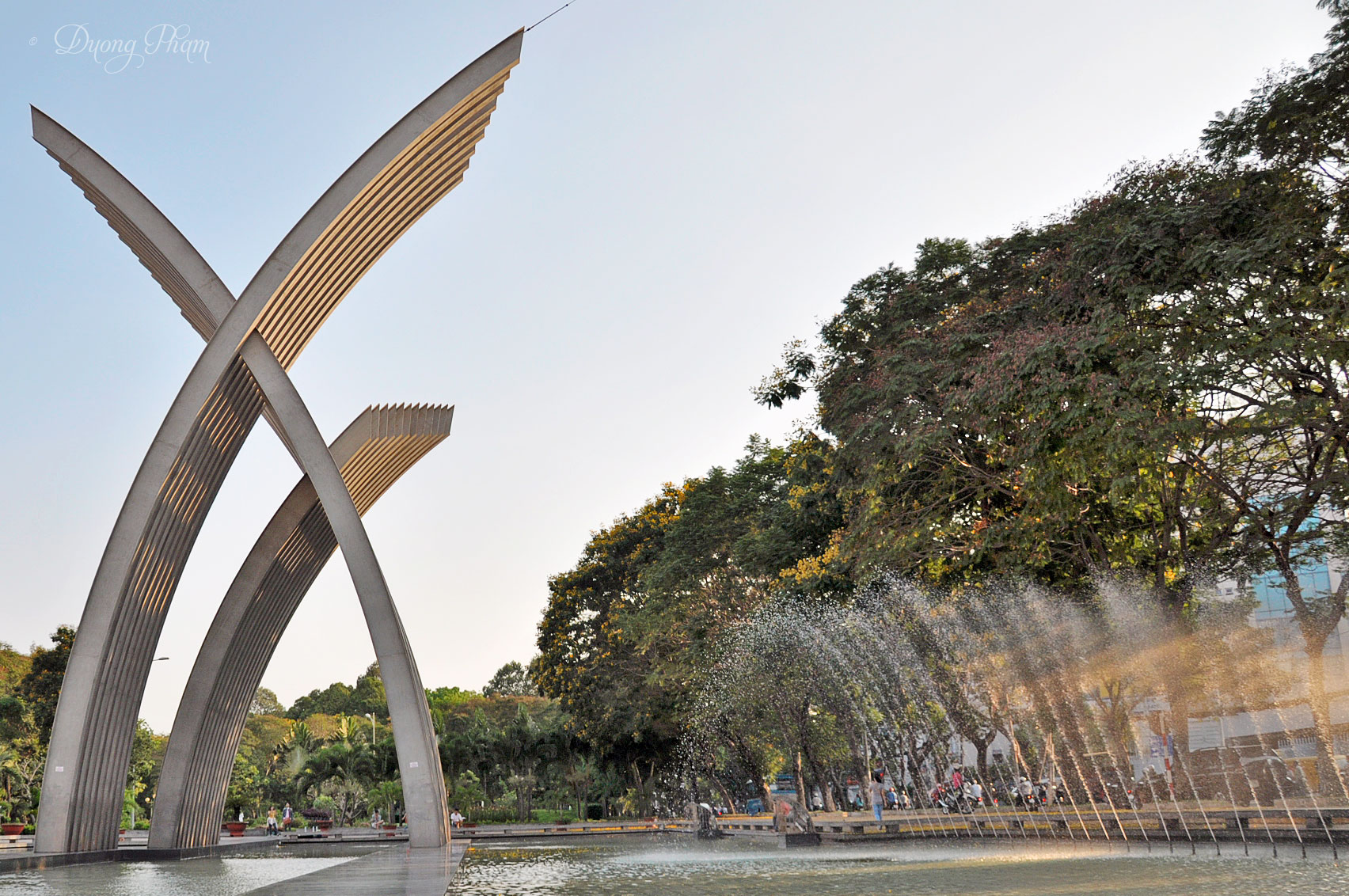
- Hoàng Văn Thụ Park
- Interactive map of Tân Sơn Hòa
- Coordinates: 10°48′22″N 106°40′01″E
- Country: Vietnam
- Municipality: Ho Chi Minh City
- Established: June 16, 2025

Area
  - Total: 1.01 sq mi (2.62 km^{2})

Population (2024)
  - Total: 64,150
  - Density: 63,400/sq mi (24,500/km^{2})
- Time zone: UTC+07:00 (Indochina Time)
- Administrative code: 26977

Tân Sơn Hòa (Vietnamese: Phường Tân Sơn Hòa) is a ward of Ho Chi Minh City, Vietnam. It is one of the 168 new wards, communes and special zones of the city following the reorganization in 2025.

== Geography ==
Tân Sơn Hòa is located in the center of Ho Chi Minh City, it is roughly 5 kilometers northwest of Saigon. it borders the following wards:

- To the north, it borders Tân Sơn
- To the northeast, it borders Hạnh Thông
- To the east, it borders Đức Nhuận and Phú Nhuận
- To the south and west, it borders Tân Sơn Nhất

According to Official Dispatch No. 2896/BNV-CQĐP dated May 27, 2025 of the Ministry of Home Affairs, following the merger, Tân Sơn Hòa has a land area of 2.62 km², the population as of December 31, 2024 is 64,150 people, the population density is 24,484 people/km².

== History ==
On June 16, 2025, the National Assembly Standing Committee issued Resolution No. 1685/NQ-UBTVQH15 on the arrangement of commune-level administrative units of Ho Chi Minh City in 2025 (effective from June 16, 2025). Accordingly, the entire land area and population of Ward 1, Ward 2 and Ward 3 of the former Tân Bình district will be integrated into a new ward named Tân Sơn Hòa (Clause 56, Article 1).
