= Phú Nhuận district =

Phú Nhuận District Quận Phú Nhuận
- Urban district
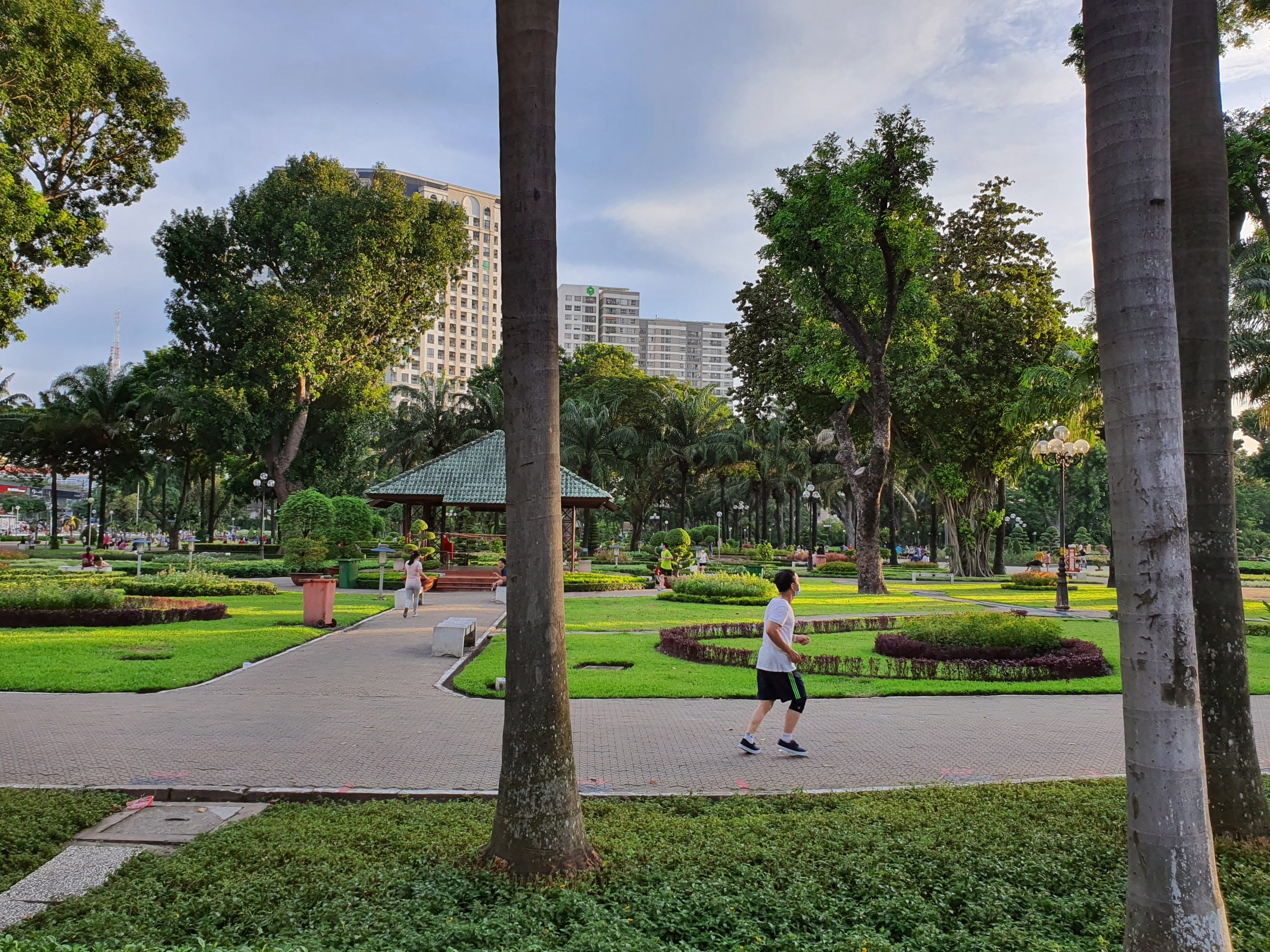
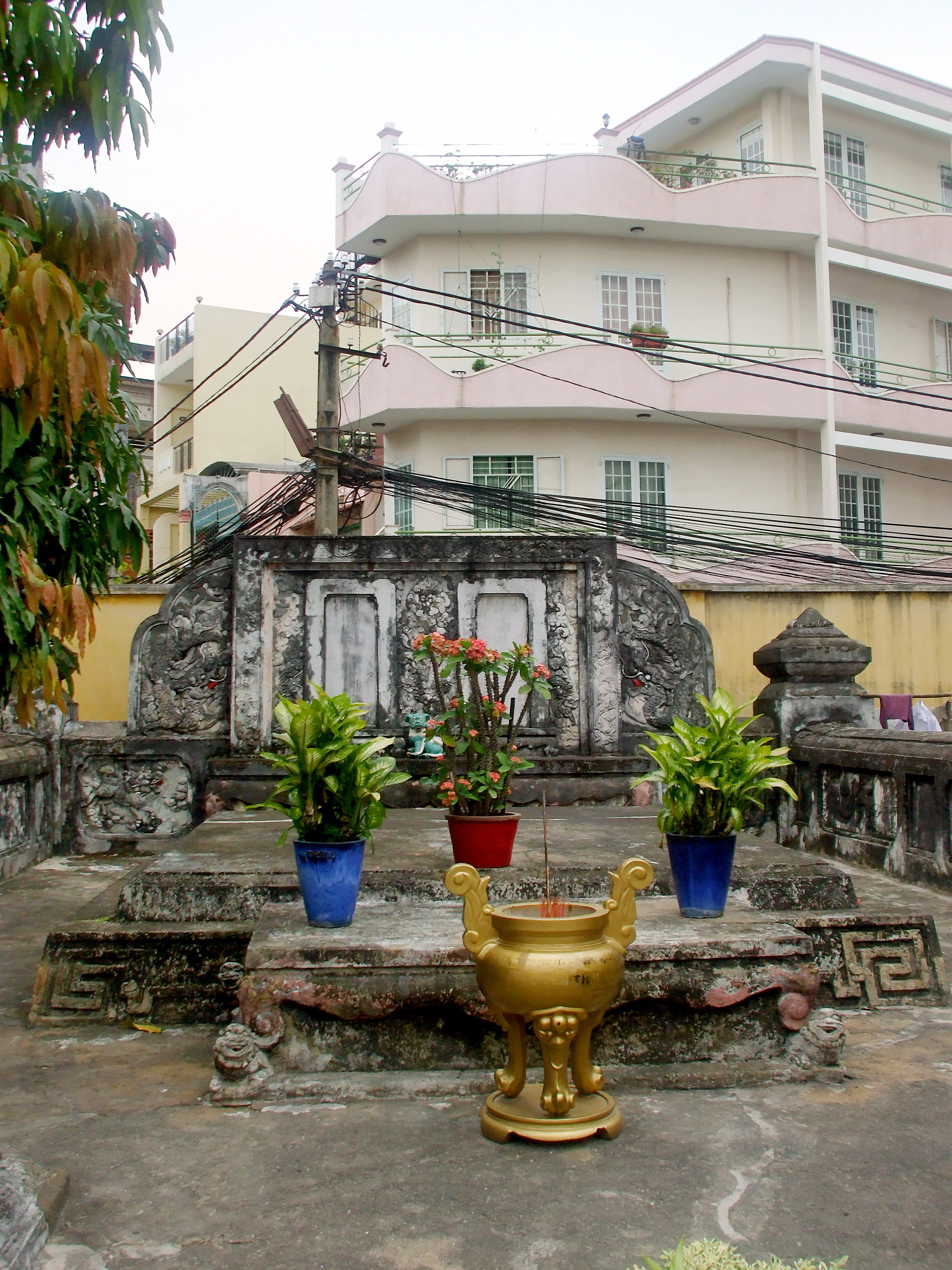
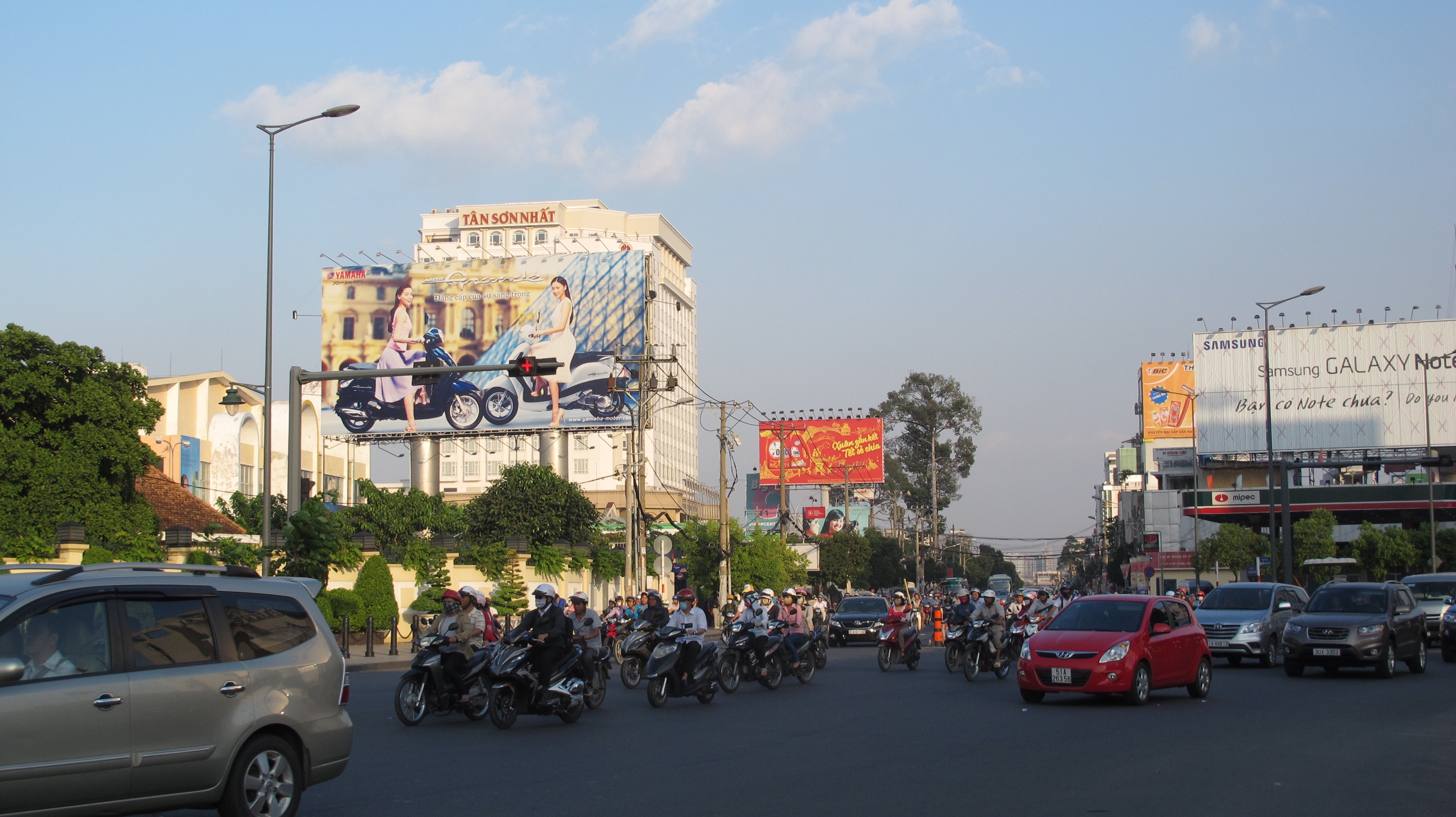
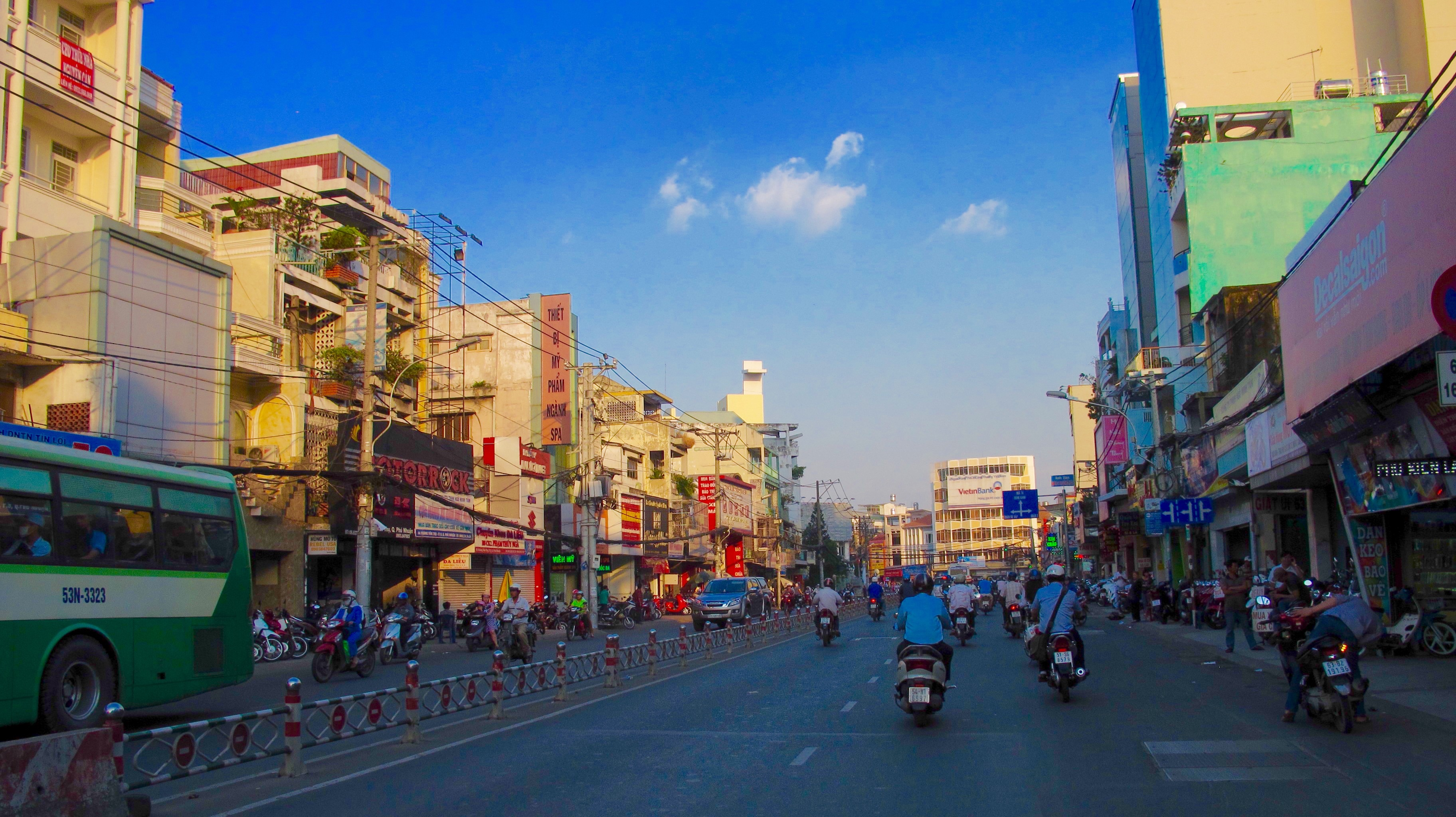
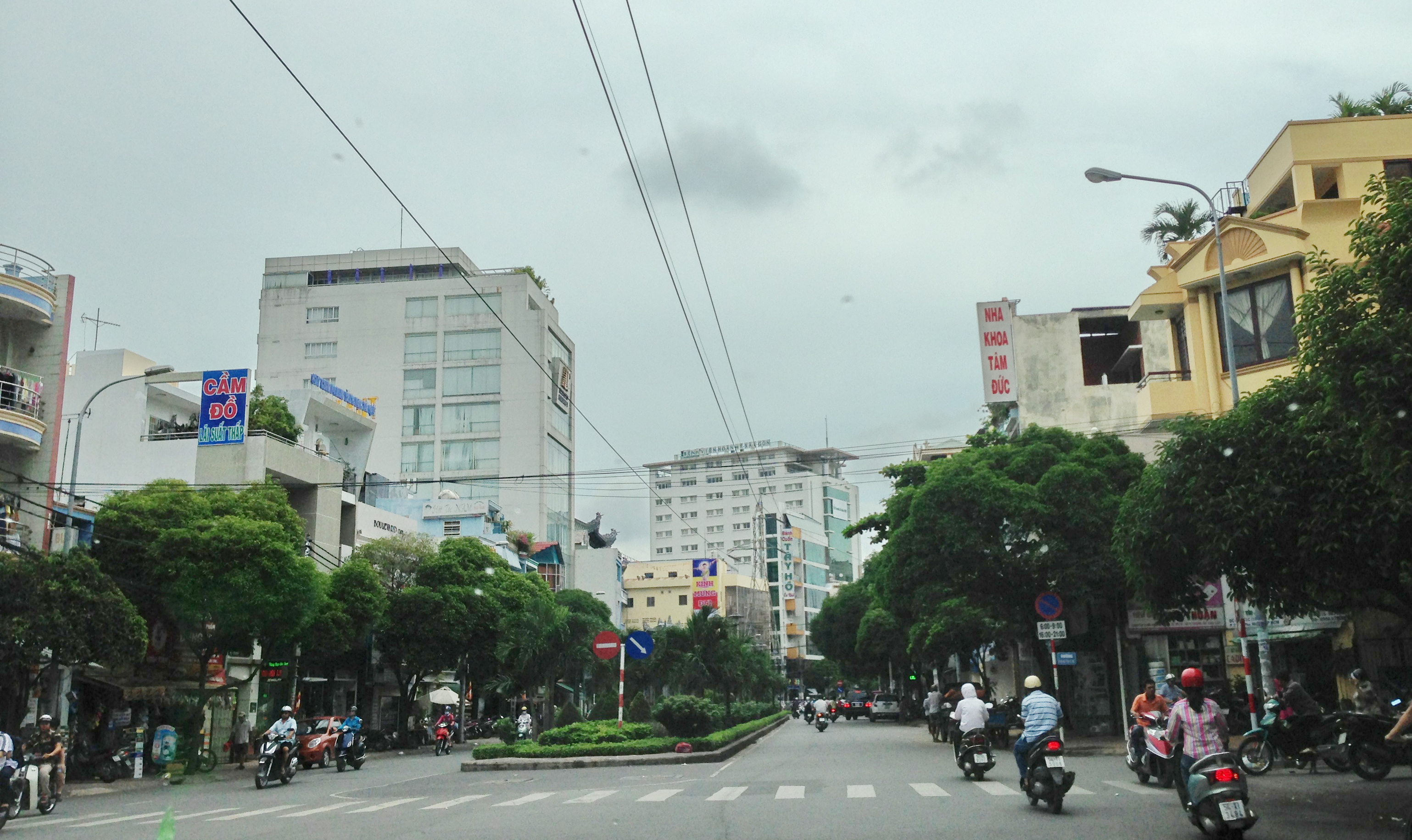
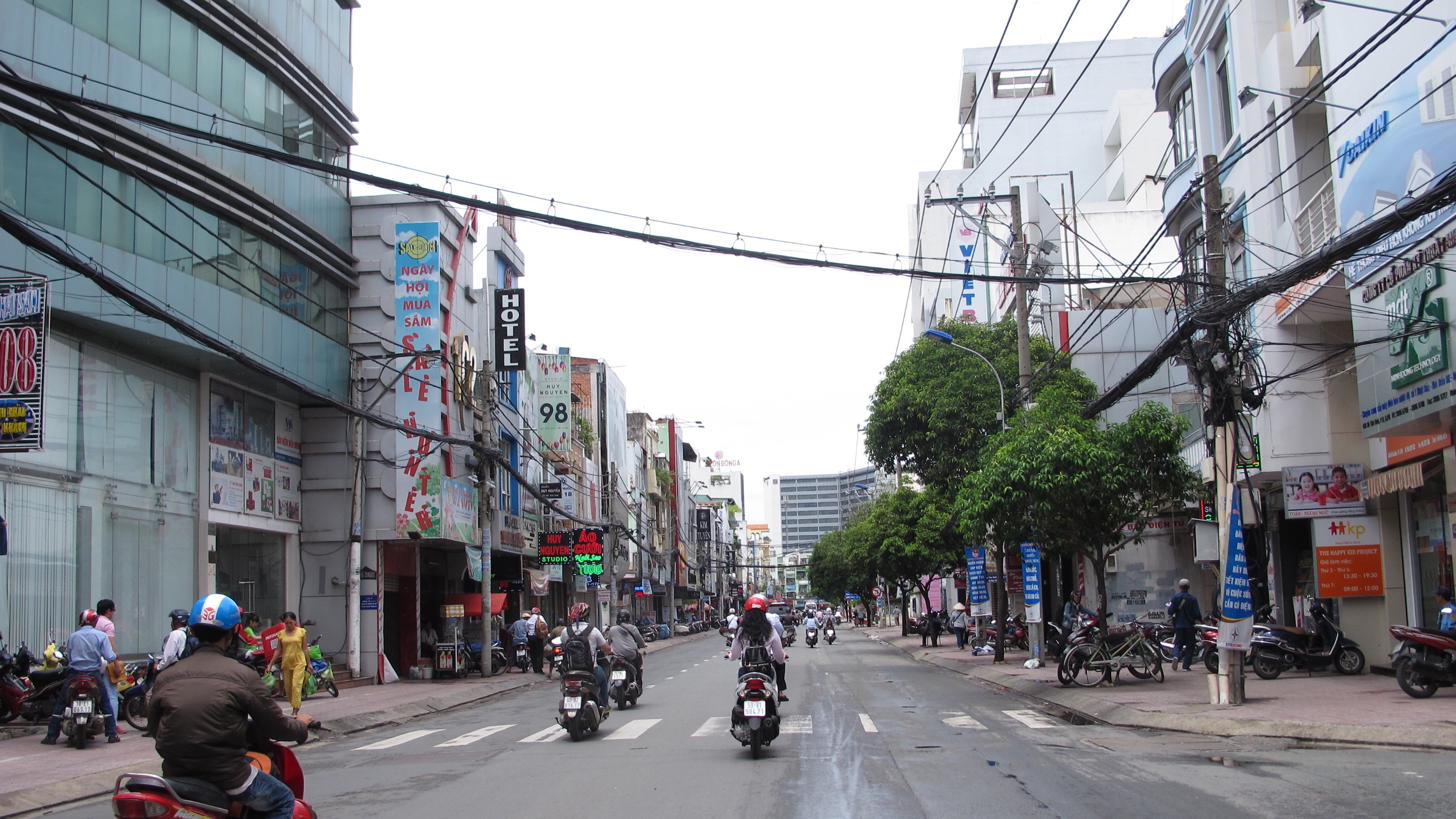
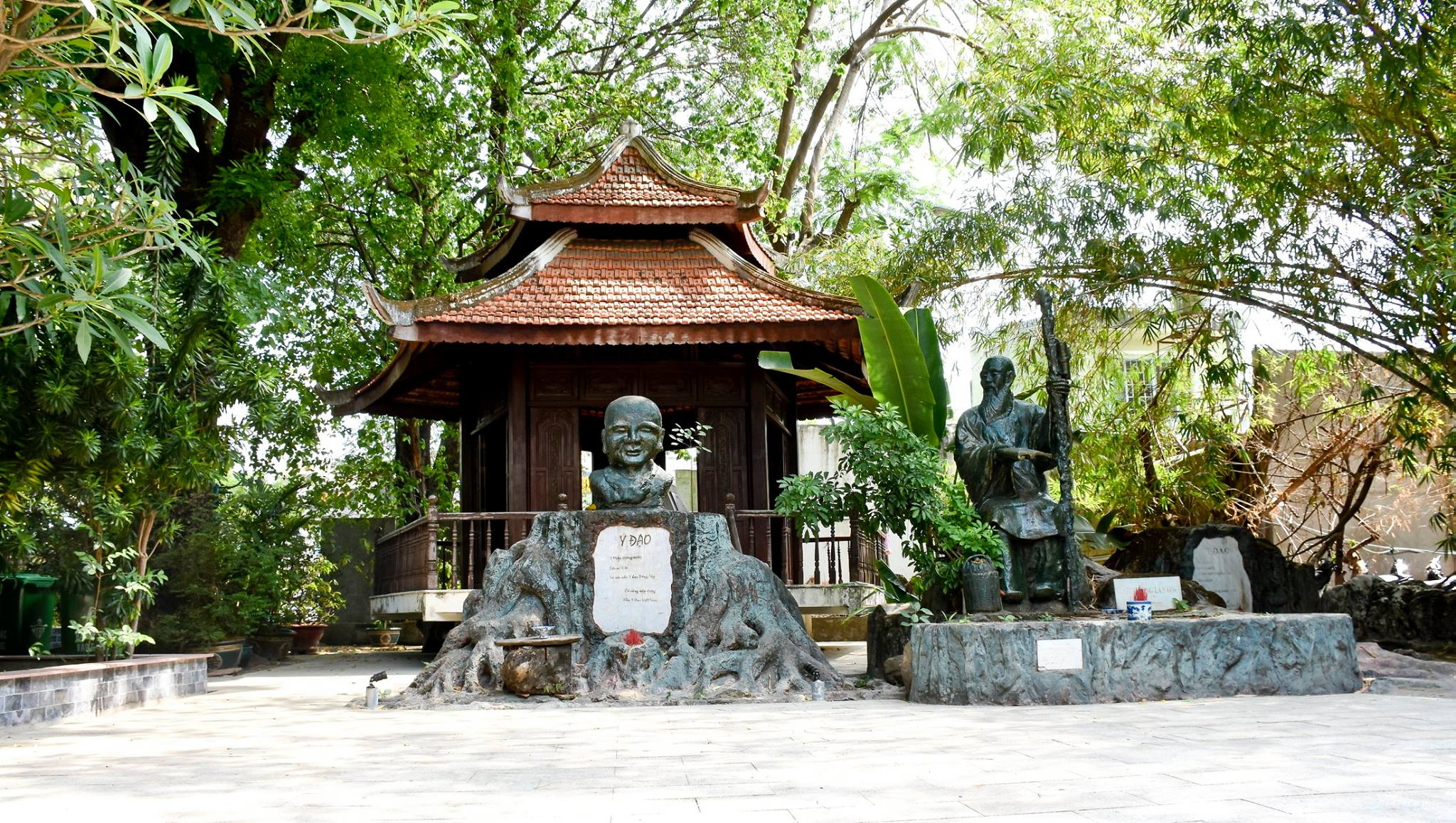
- From top to bottom, left to right: Gia Định Park, Tomb of Võ Di Nguy, Tân Sơn Nhất Hotel, Phú Nhuận intersection with the Vietinbank Building (formerly building of Commercial Bank of Vietnam), Phan Xích Long Food Street with Hoàn Mỹ Saigon Hospital in the middle, Hồ Văn Huế street - street of wedding dress, Traditional Medicine Institute

- Location within Vietnam
- Coordinates: 10°48′6″N 106°40′39″E
- Country: Vietnam
- Centrally governed city: Ho Chi Minh City
- Founded: 1955: Phú Nhuận commune, Tân Bình district, Gia Định; 1975: Phú Nhuận district, Saigon
- Wards: 13

Area
  - Total: 4.86 km^{2} (1.88 sq mi)

Population (2024)
  - Total: 213,961
  - Density: 44,000/km^{2} (114,000/sq mi)

Demographics
  - Main ethnic groups: Predominantly Việt
- Time zone: UTC+07:00 (ICT)
- Website: www.phunhuan.hochiminhcity.gov.vn

Phú Nhuận is one of the nineteen former urban districts in Ho Chi Minh City, Vietnam. It is densely populated, with 180,100 inhabitants in an area of just 4.88 km^{2}. Phú Nhuận district is sometimes considered the center of Ho Chi Minh City due to its central location from all of the surrounding districts. As of 2003 the district had a population of 181,243. The district covers an area of 5 km^{2}.

== Administrative divisions ==
There are 11 wards in Phú Nhuận District as of January 2025:

- Ward 1
- Ward 2
- Ward 4
- Ward 5
- Ward 7
- Ward 8
- Ward 9
- Ward 10
- Ward 11
- Ward 13
- Ward 15

In 2021, Vietnam's Standing Committee of the National Assembly decided to merge Wards 11 and 12, and Wards 13 and 14 of Phú Nhuận. The new wards are named Ward 11 and Ward 13, respectively. A similar process was done to Wards 6 and 16 in 1982.

In 2025, due to the rearrangement of administrative divisions that the district-level is terminated, Phú Nhuận district has dissolved into 3 wards of Phú Nhuận (Ward 8, 10, 11, 13 and southern part of Ward 15; formerly Ward 17), Đức Nhuận (Ward 4, 5 and 9) and Cầu Kiệu (Ward 1, 2 and 7 and part of Ward 15).

On 1 July 2025, Phú Nhuận District was dissolved as part of Vietnam's administrative reorganization. Its former territory was reorganized into the wards of Phú Nhuận, Cầu Kiệu, and Đức Nhuận.

== Economy ==
Phú Nhuận has been an extension of Saigon, when it was still a commune of Gia Định province and was a suburb of Saigon with housing estates for civil servants built here (e.g. Chu Mạnh Trinh residentials, now is Đoàn Thị Điểm street) with bustling markets not far from Saigon (e.g. Phú Nhuận Market, Trần Hữu Trang Market...).

With its location in between the route from the city center to the airport and the wave of population dispersion, Phú Nhuận district is gradually becoming busier, leading to the emergence of office towers and modern housing projects blending with the old ones

=== Office buildings ===
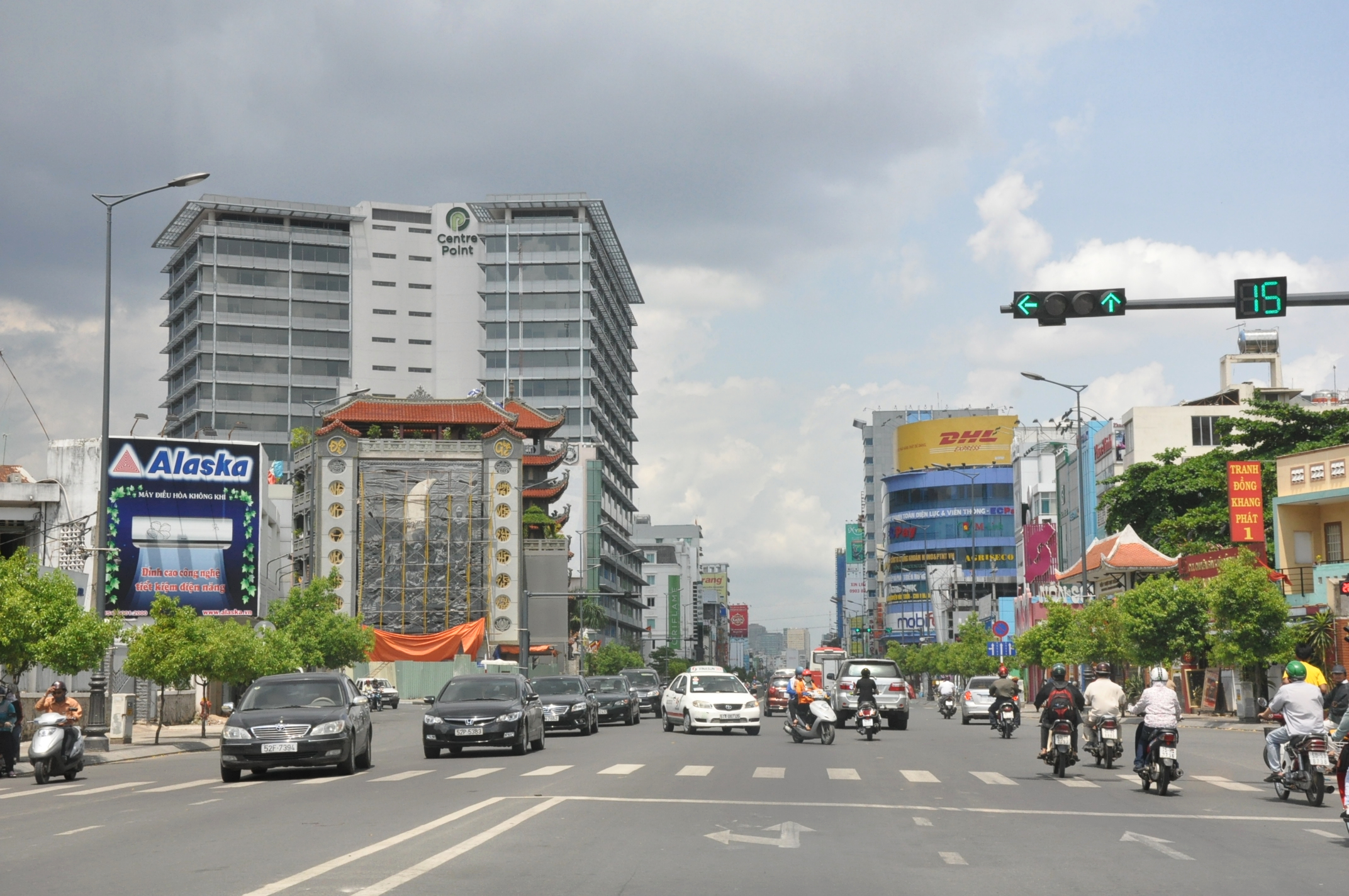
Mapletree Centre Point (left) and Cát Tường Building (right)

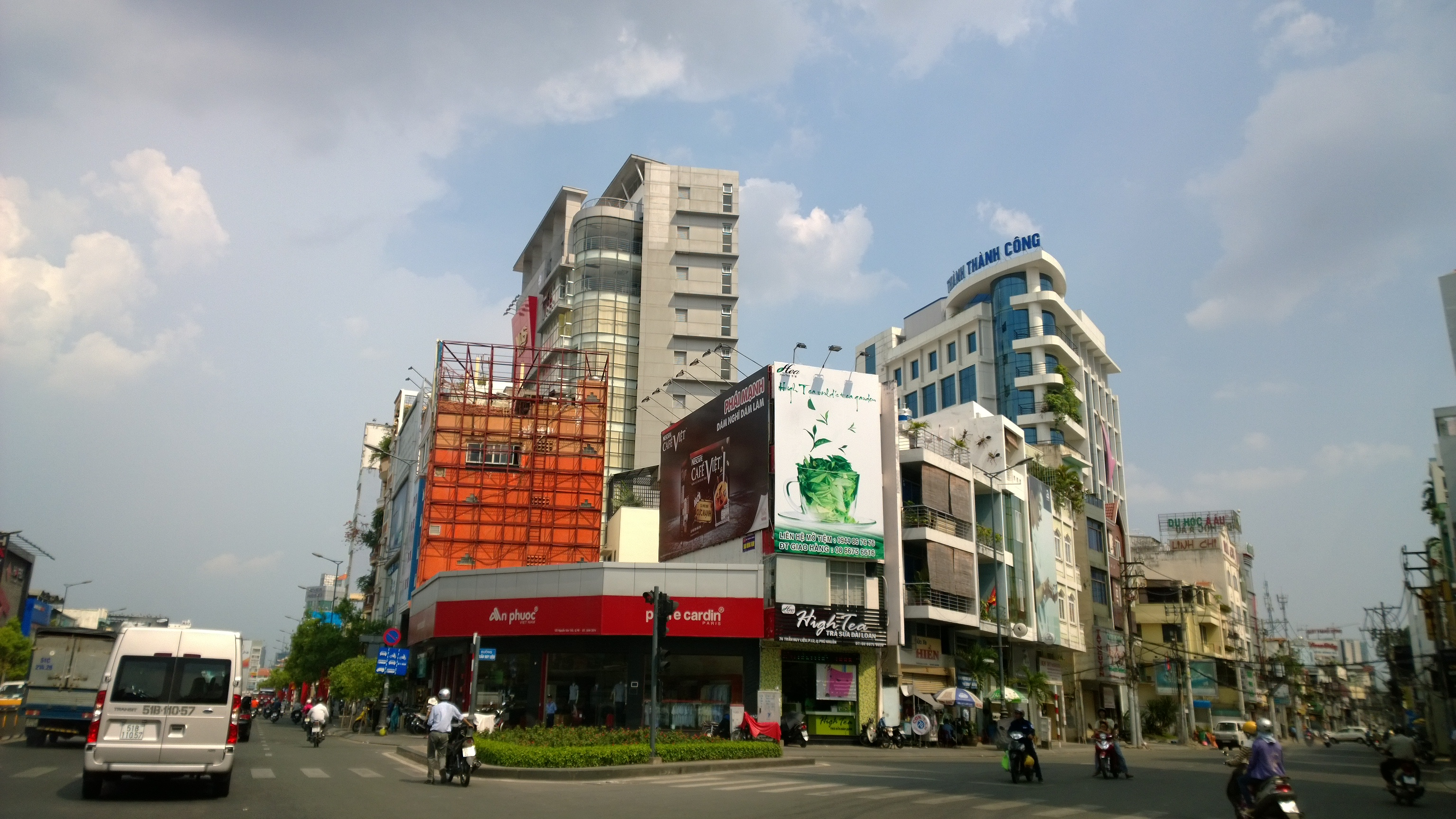
Buildings at corner of Nguyễn Văn Trỗi - Trần Huy Liệu

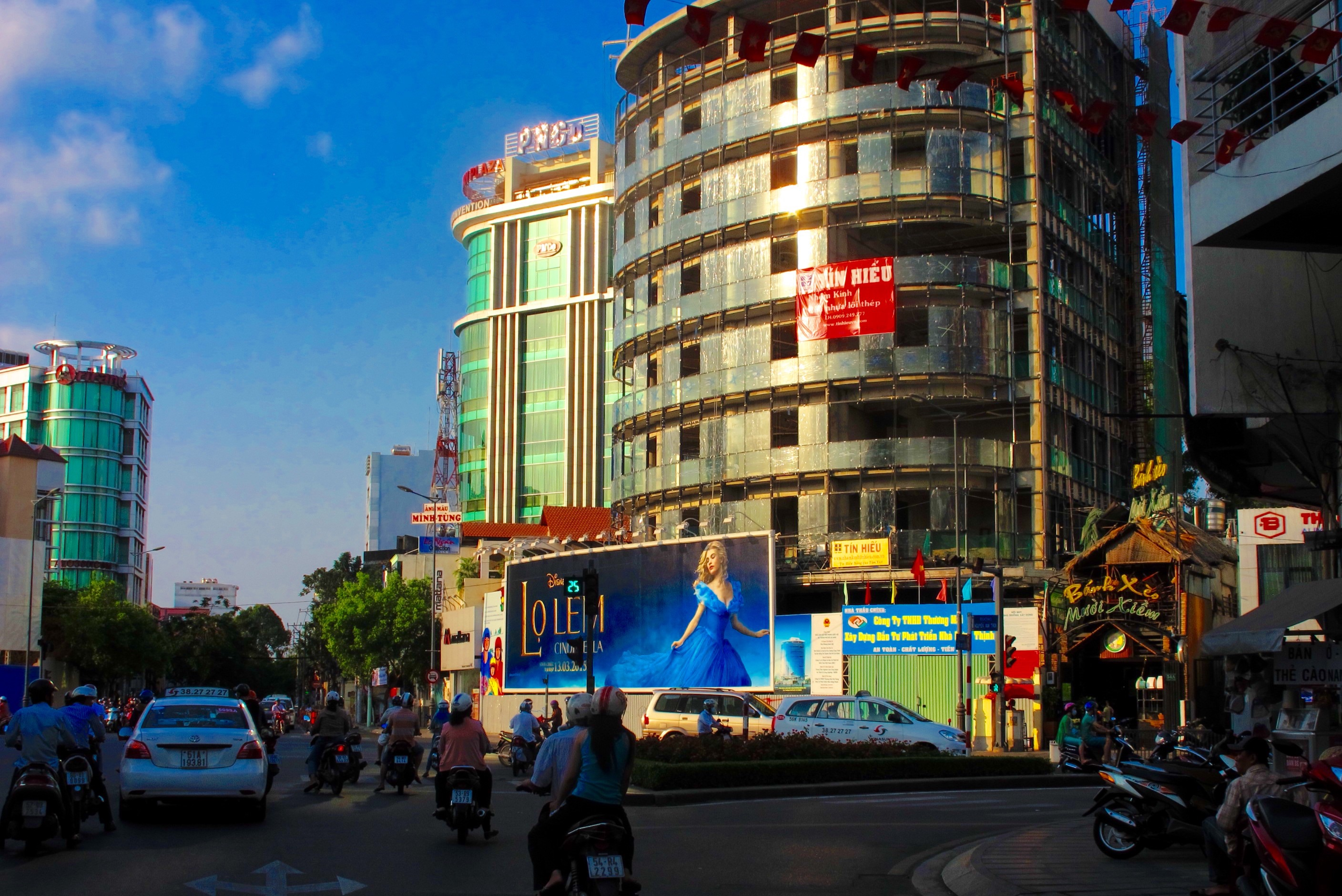
Buildings at corner of Nguyễn Văn Trỗi - Trần Huy Liệu

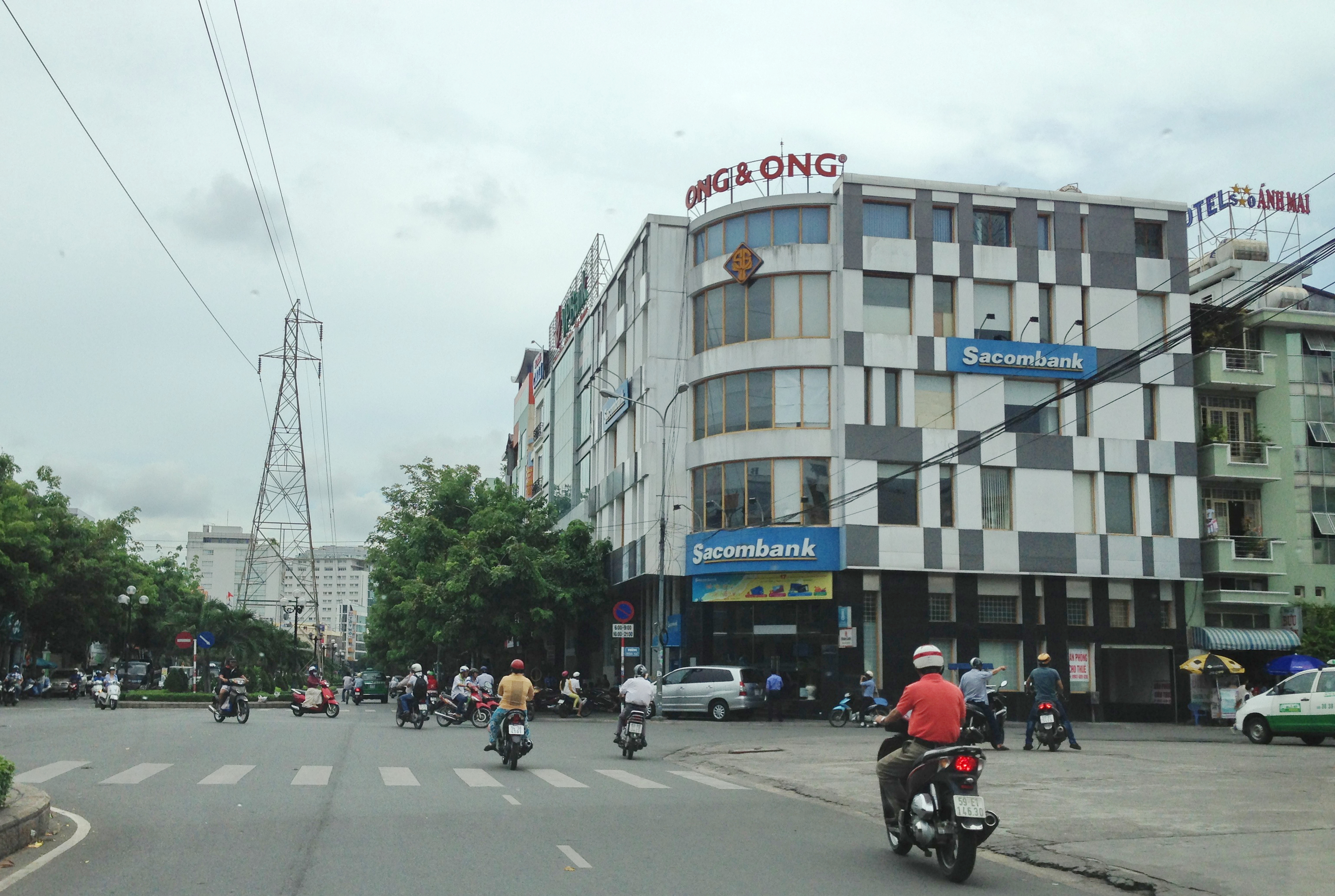
Ong & Ong 159 Phan Xích Long Building

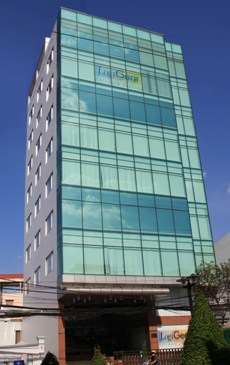
LogiGear Tower

=== Housing projects ===
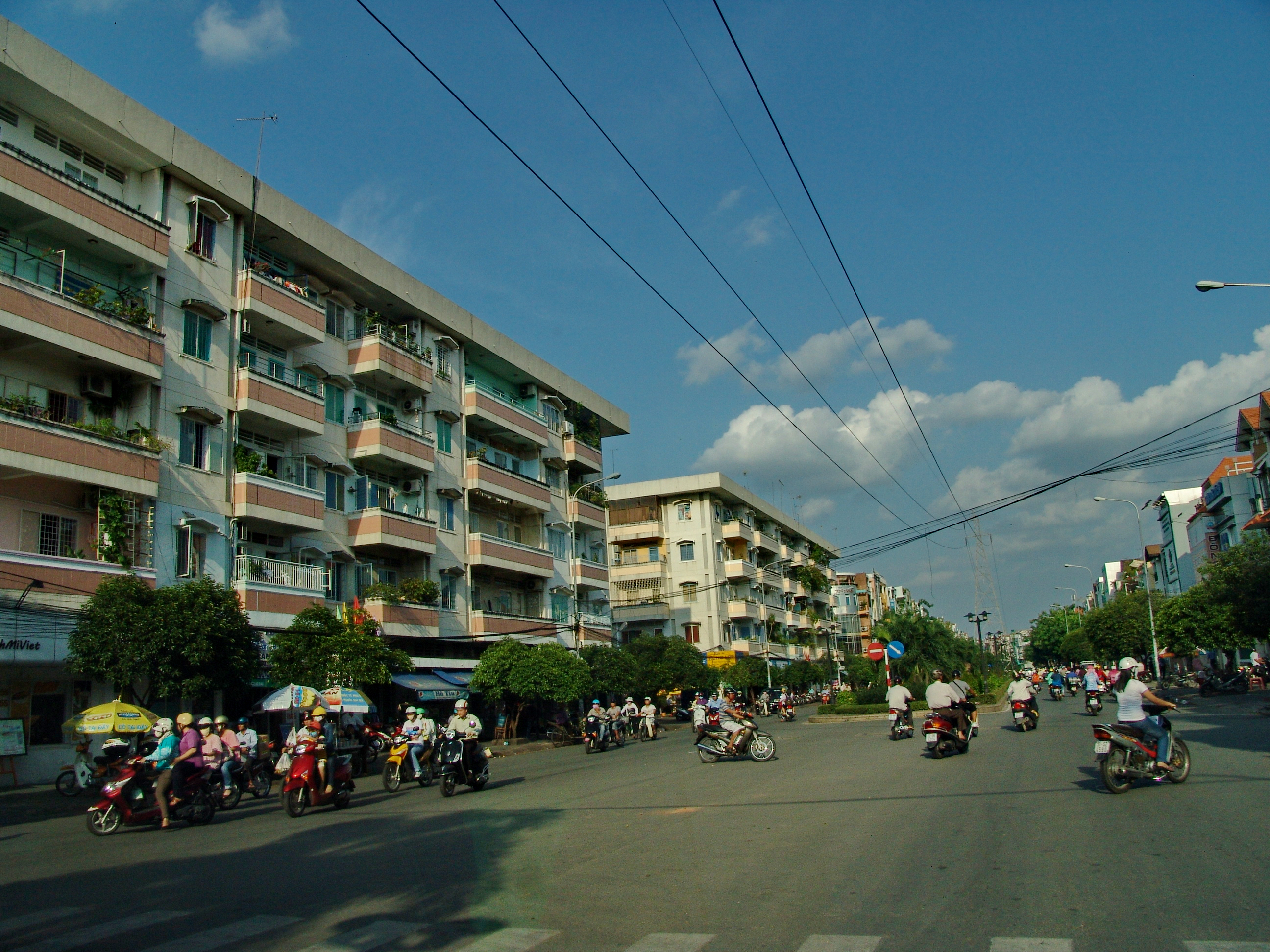
Phan Xích Long Apartment

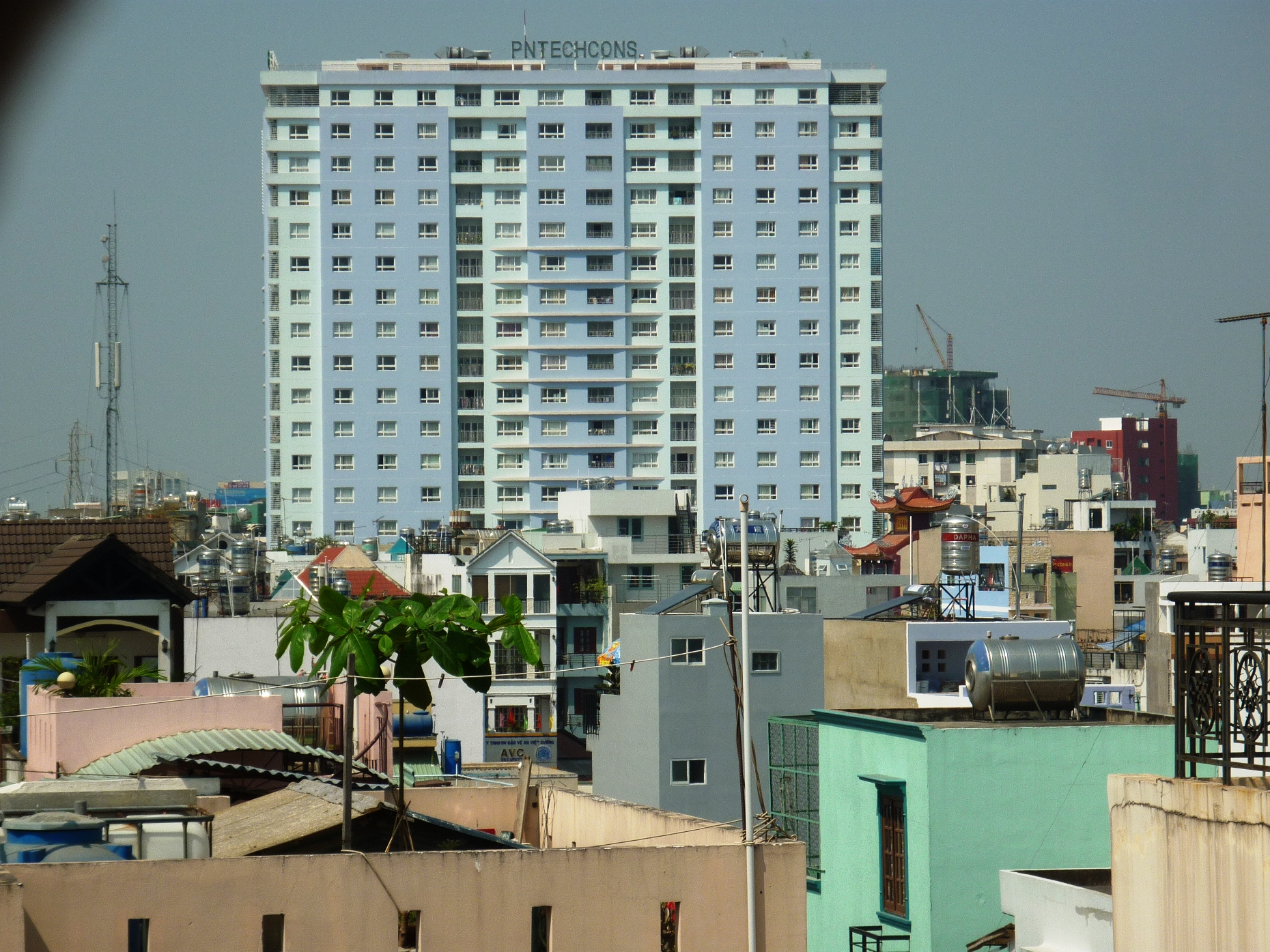
PNTechcons Apartment in Rạch Miễu Residents

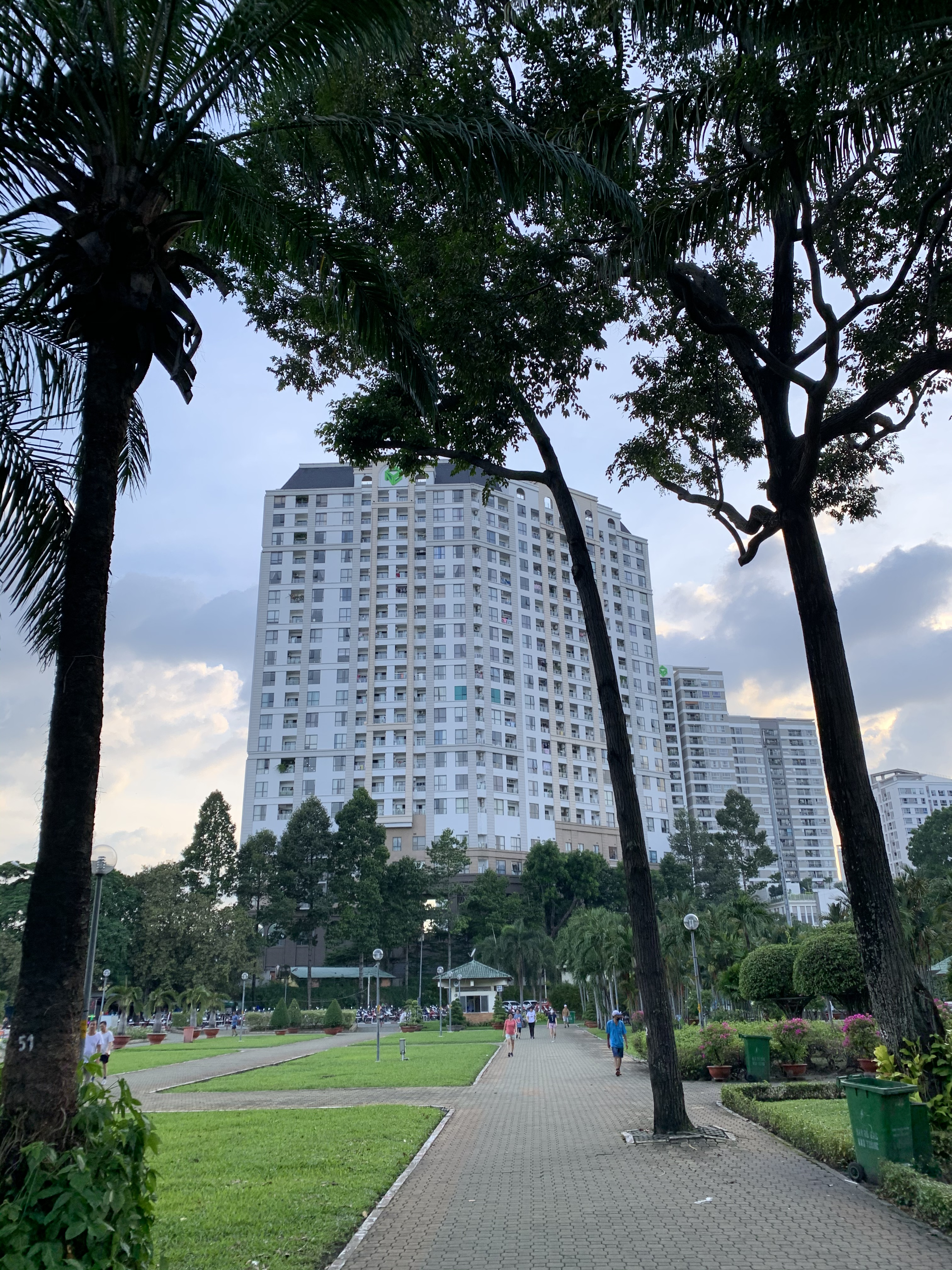
Novaland Golden Gate

The Prince Residence

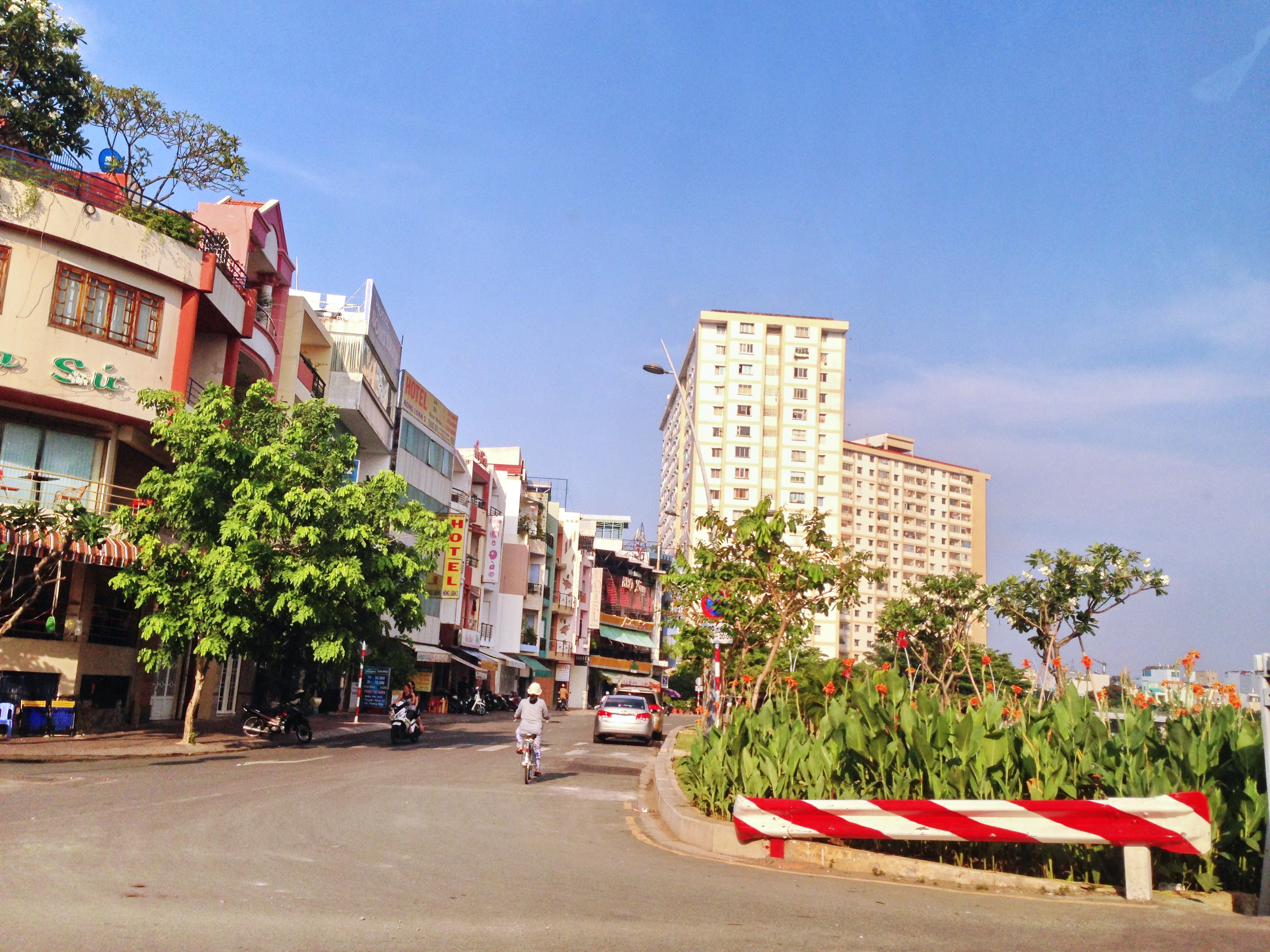
Rạch Miễu Residents next to Trần Khánh Dư Bridge passes the Nhiêu Lộc–Thị Nghè Channel with Miếu Nổi Apartment in Bình Thạnh district from the back

== Religious culture ==
Phú Nhuận is a diverse culture area, in addition to the two predominant religions of Buddhism and Christianity, there is also an Islamic area around Phú Nhuận market.

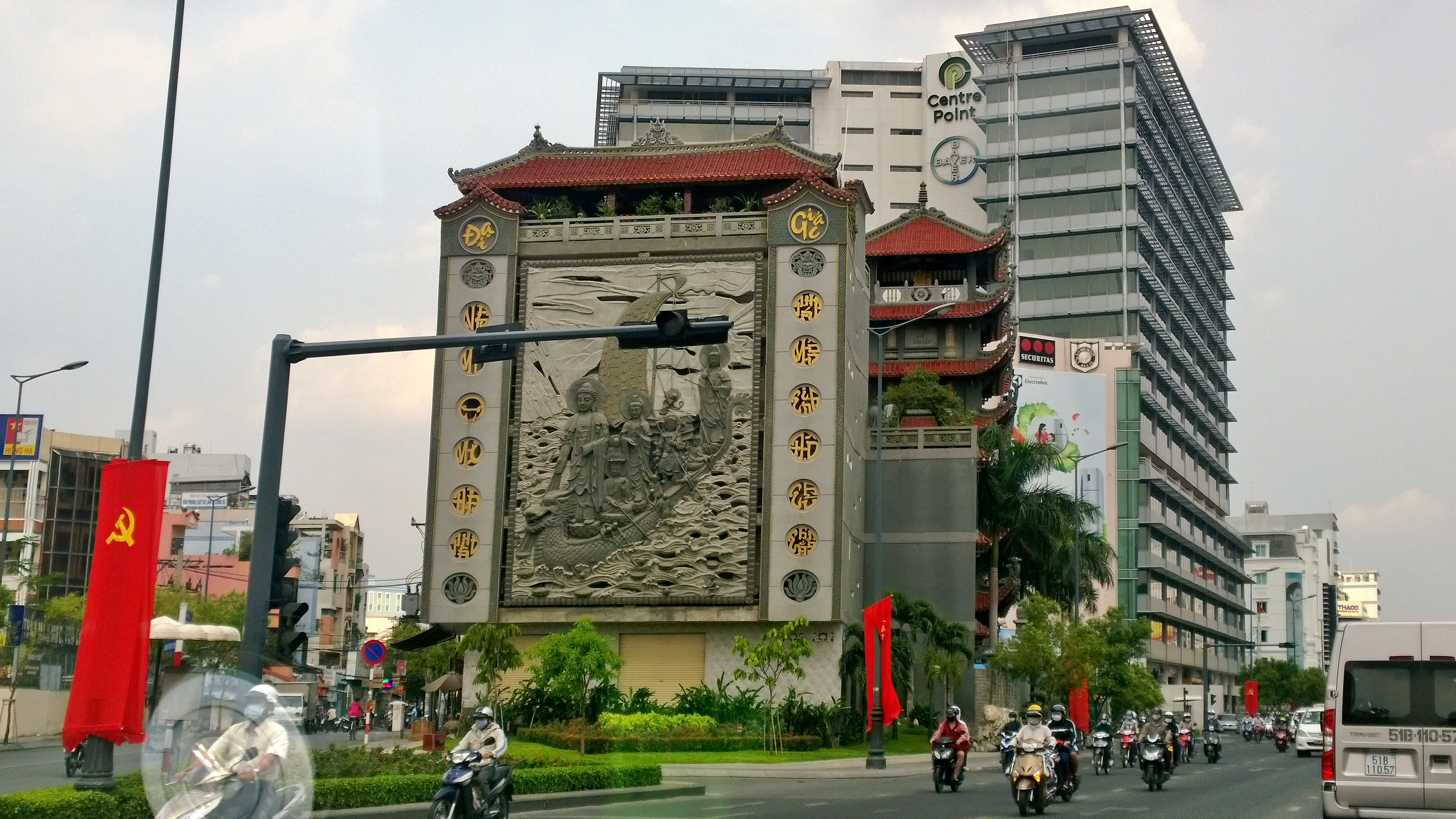
Đại Giác Temple

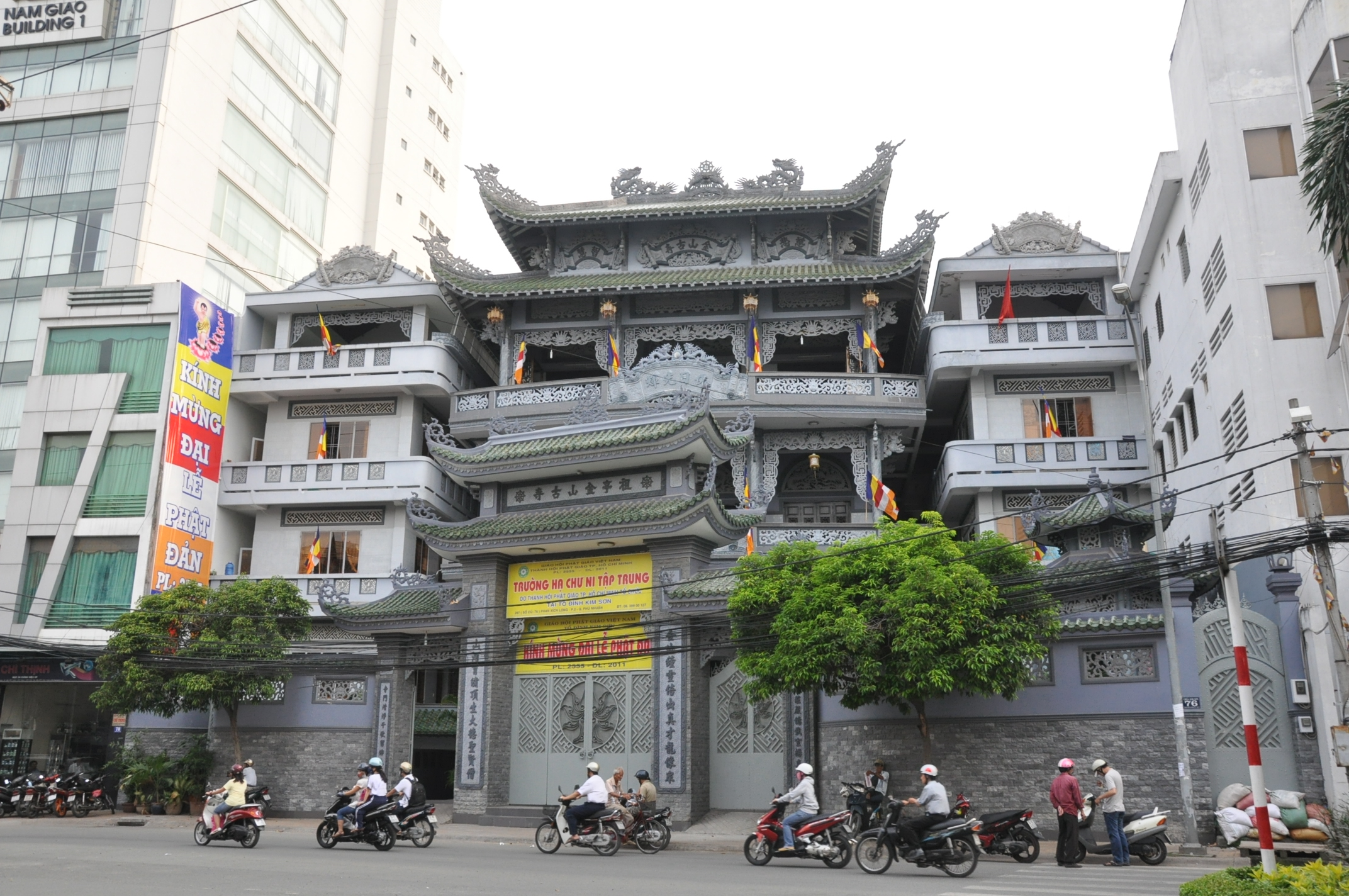
Kim Sơn Temple

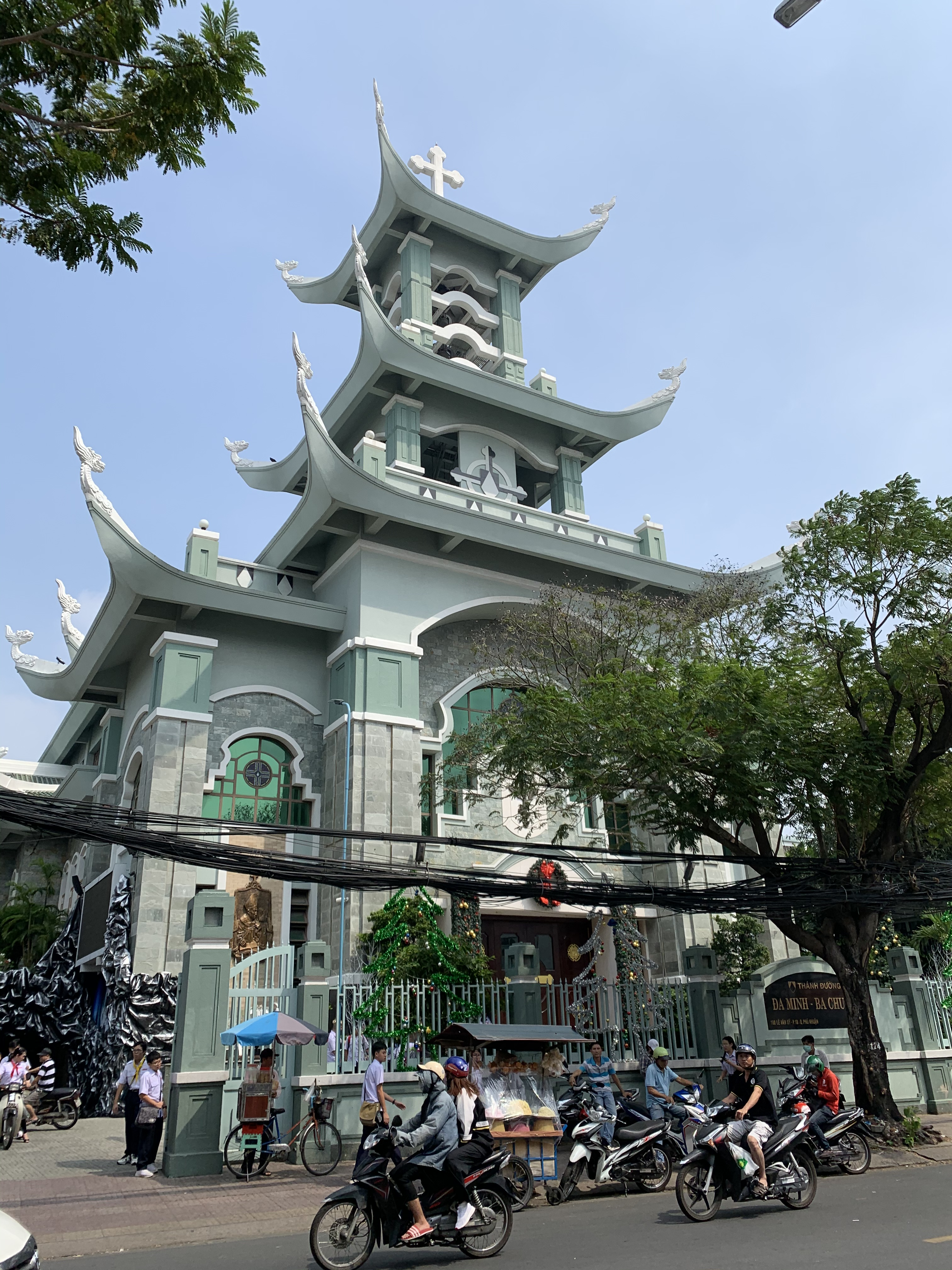
St. Dominic Three Bells Church

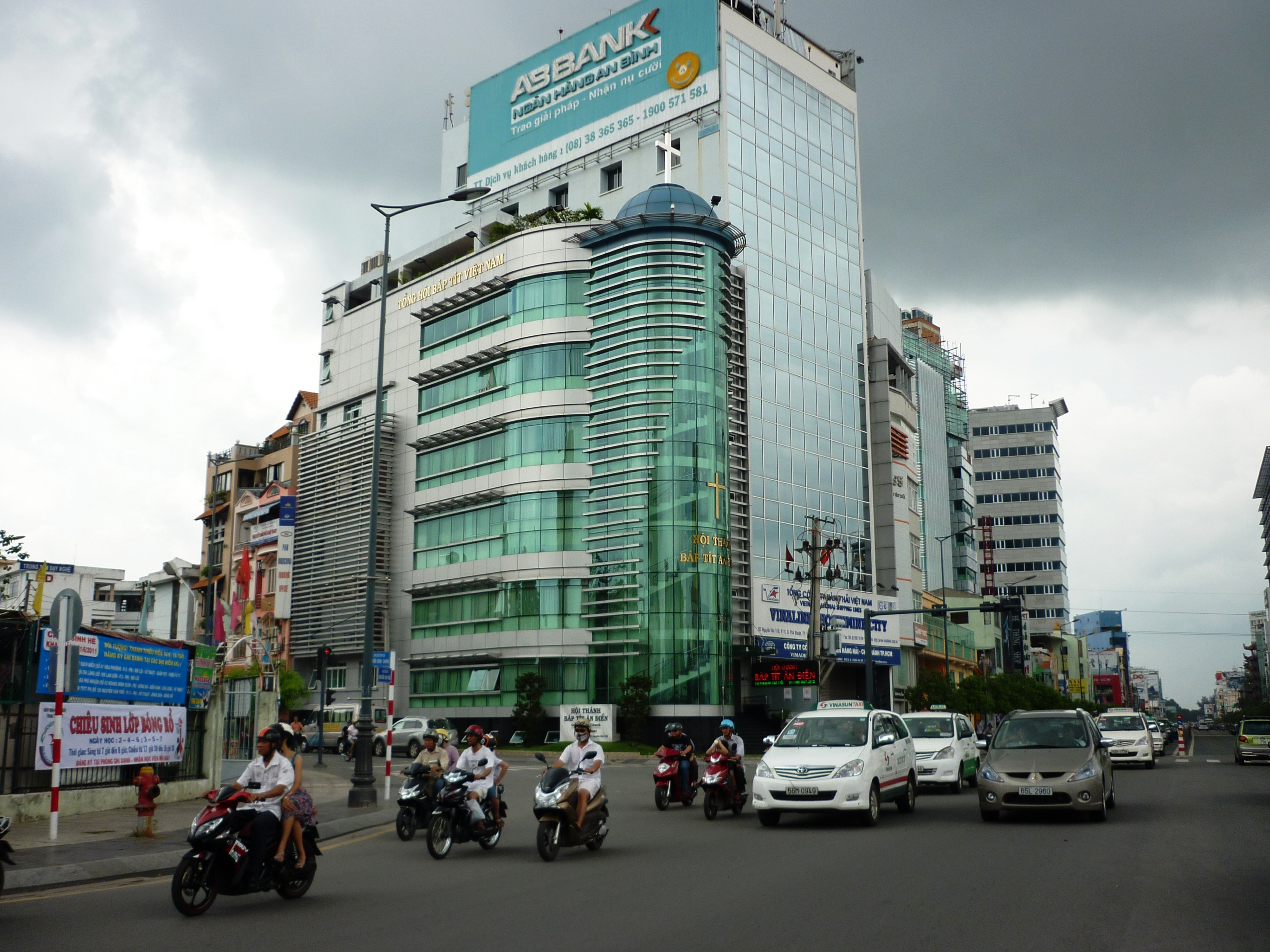
Grace Baptist Church

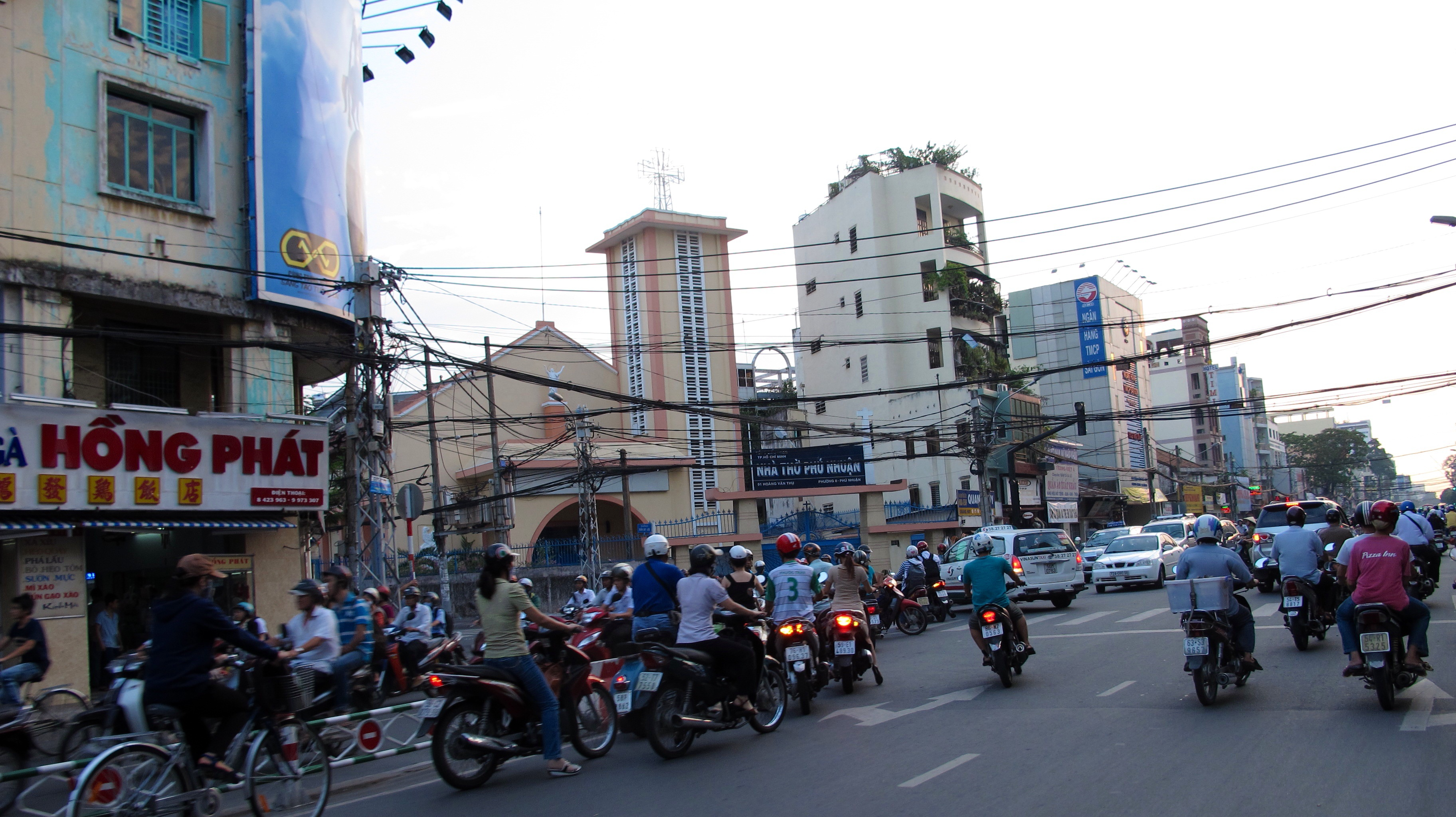
Phú Nhuận Church

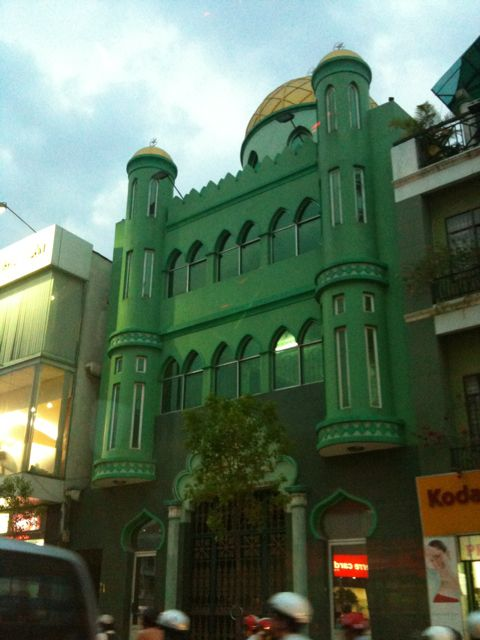
Jamiul Muslimin Mosque
