= Hạnh Thông =

Hạnh Thông Phường Hạnh Thông Hanh Thông, Gò Vấp
- Ward
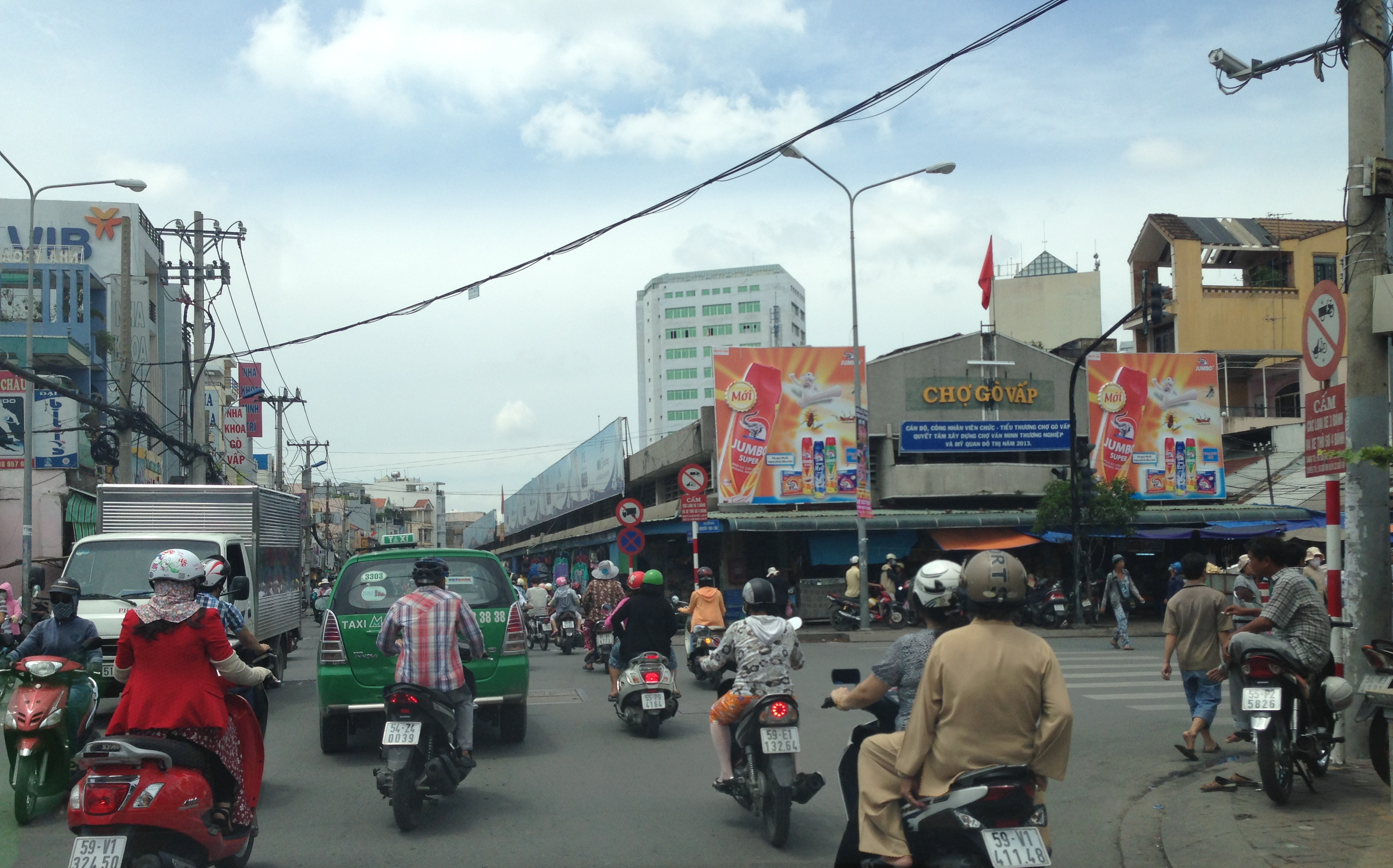
- Gò Vấp Market
- Interactive map of Hạnh Thông
- Coordinates: 10°49′13″N 106°41′00″E
- Country: Vietnam
- Municipality: Ho Chi Minh City
- Established: June 16, 2025

Area
  - Total: 1.30 sq mi (3.37 km^{2})

Population (2024)
  - Total: 128,865
  - Density: 99,000/sq mi (38,200/km^{2})
- Time zone: UTC+07:00 (Indochina Time)
- Administrative code: 26890

Hạnh Thông (Vietnamese: Phường Hạnh Thông) is a ward of Ho Chi Minh City, Vietnam. It is one of the 168 new wards, communes and special zones of the city following the reorganization in 2025.

== Geography ==
Hạnh Thông is a central ward of Ho Chi Minh City, located just 7 km northeast of Saigon ward, with the following geographical location:

- To the north, it borders Gò Vấp.
- To the south, it borders Bình Lợi Trung and Đức Nhuận.
- To the east, it borders An Nhơn.
- To the west, it borders Tân Sơn and Tân Sơn Hòa.

According to Official Dispatch No. 2896/BNV-CQĐP dated May 27, 2025 of the Ministry of Home Affairs, following the merger, Hạnh Thông has a land area of 3.37 km², the population as of December 31, 2024 is 127,135 people, the population density is 37,725 people/km².

== History ==
On June 16, 2025, the National Assembly Standing Committee issued Resolution No. 1685/NQ-UBTVQH15 on the arrangement of commune-level administrative units of Ho Chi Minh City in 2025 (effective from June 16, 2025). Accordingly, the entire land area and population of Ward 1 and Ward 3 of the former Gò Vấp district will be integrated into a new ward named Hạnh Thông (Clause 47, Article 1).

== Transportation ==
=== Railway ===
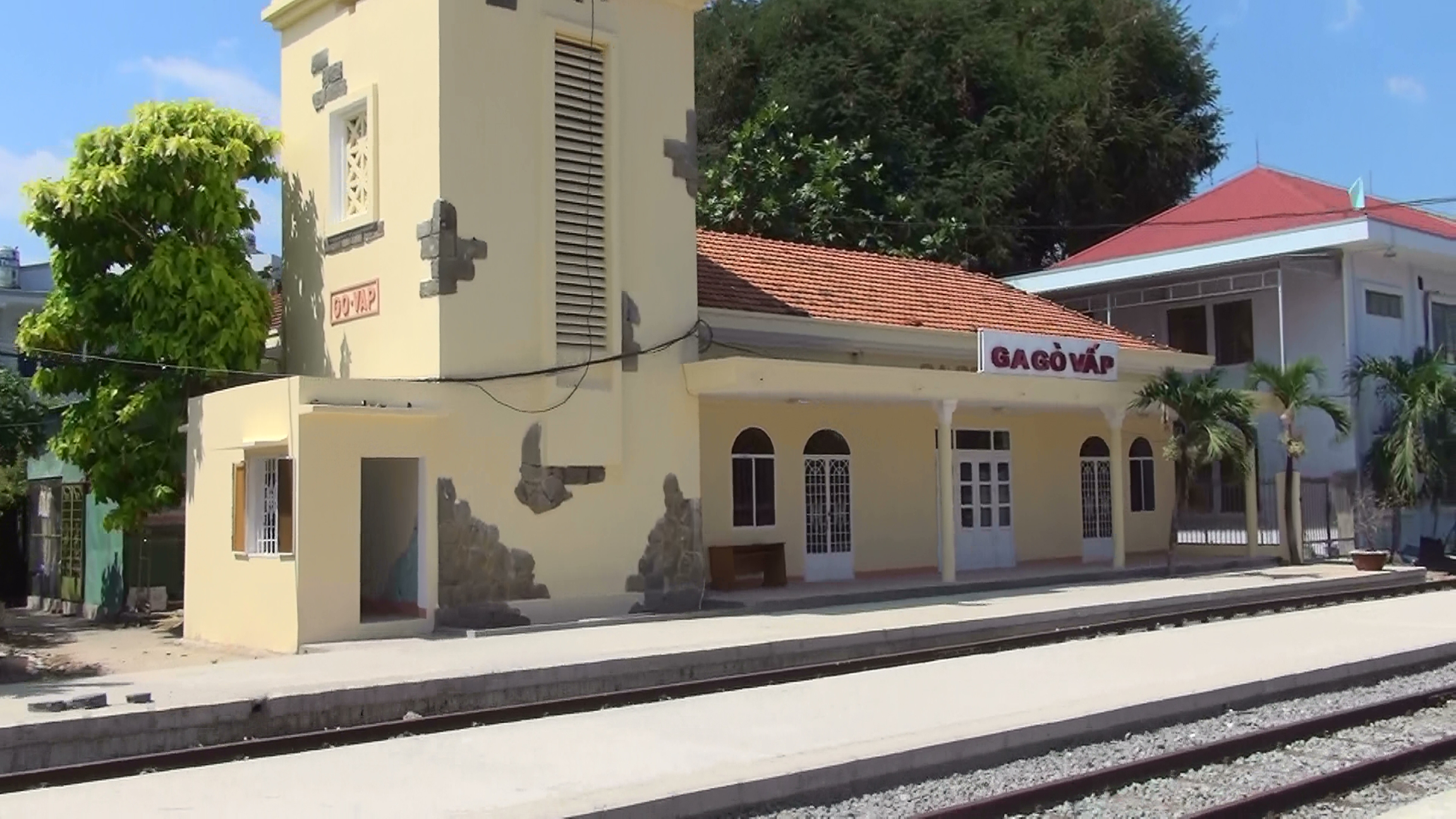
Gò Vấp Station

The North–South railway goes through the ward with one stop Gò Vấp station at No.1 Lê Lai.

=== Metro ===
The Ho Chi Minh City Metro has Line 4, a north-south axis line. The line goes through the ward and has a stop at Chú ía Intersection, which is now known as Nguyễn Thái Sơn Intersection, next to the Miliatary Hospital 175.

== Healthcare ==
The Military Hospital 175 is located in the ward on corner of Nguyễn Thái Sơn and Nguyễn Kiệm Street

== Education ==
=== University ===
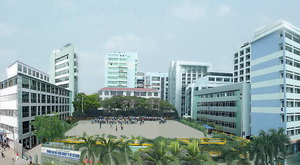
Ho Chi Minh City International University
- Ho Chi Minh City International University
- Gia Định University

=== High school ===
- Gò Vấp High School, the only school in Ho Chi Minh City to have a student won the "Road to Mount Olympia" (Đường lên đỉnh Olympia) competition up to now

== Gallery ==
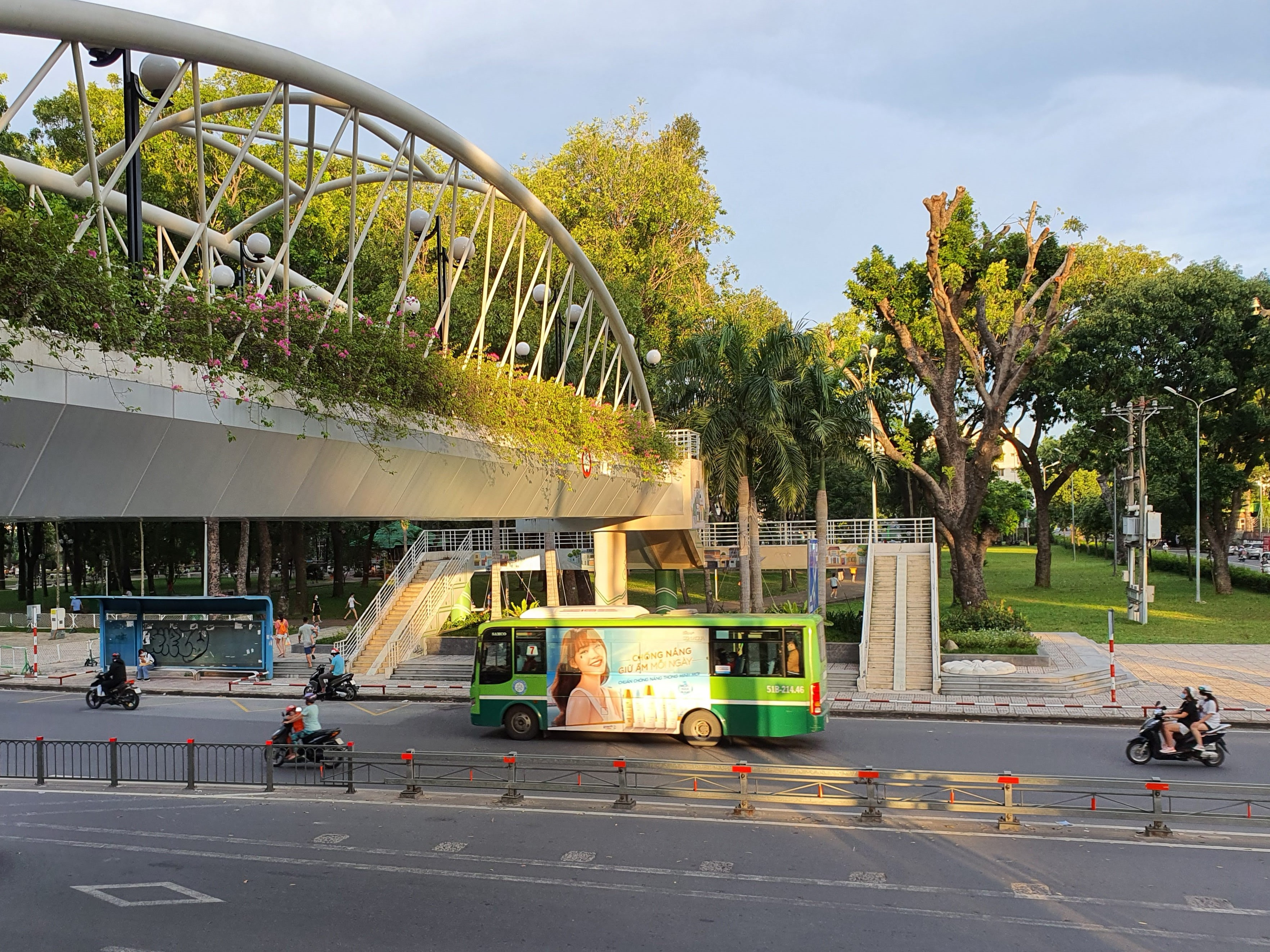
Pedestrian Bridge over Hoàng Minh Giám road at Gia Định Park

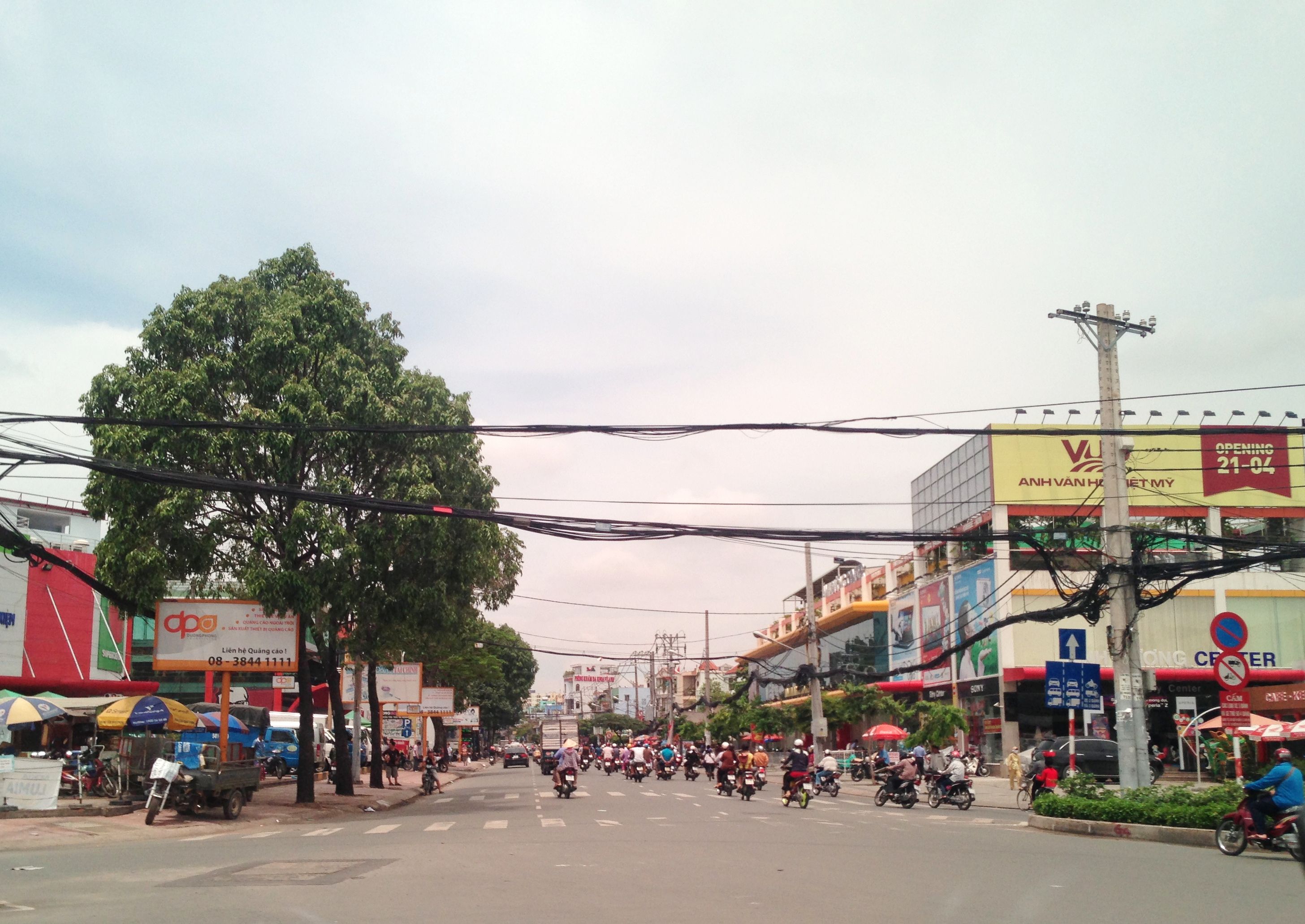
Nguyễn Kiệm Street with Big C Gò Vấp (now is Go! Gò Vấp; on the left)

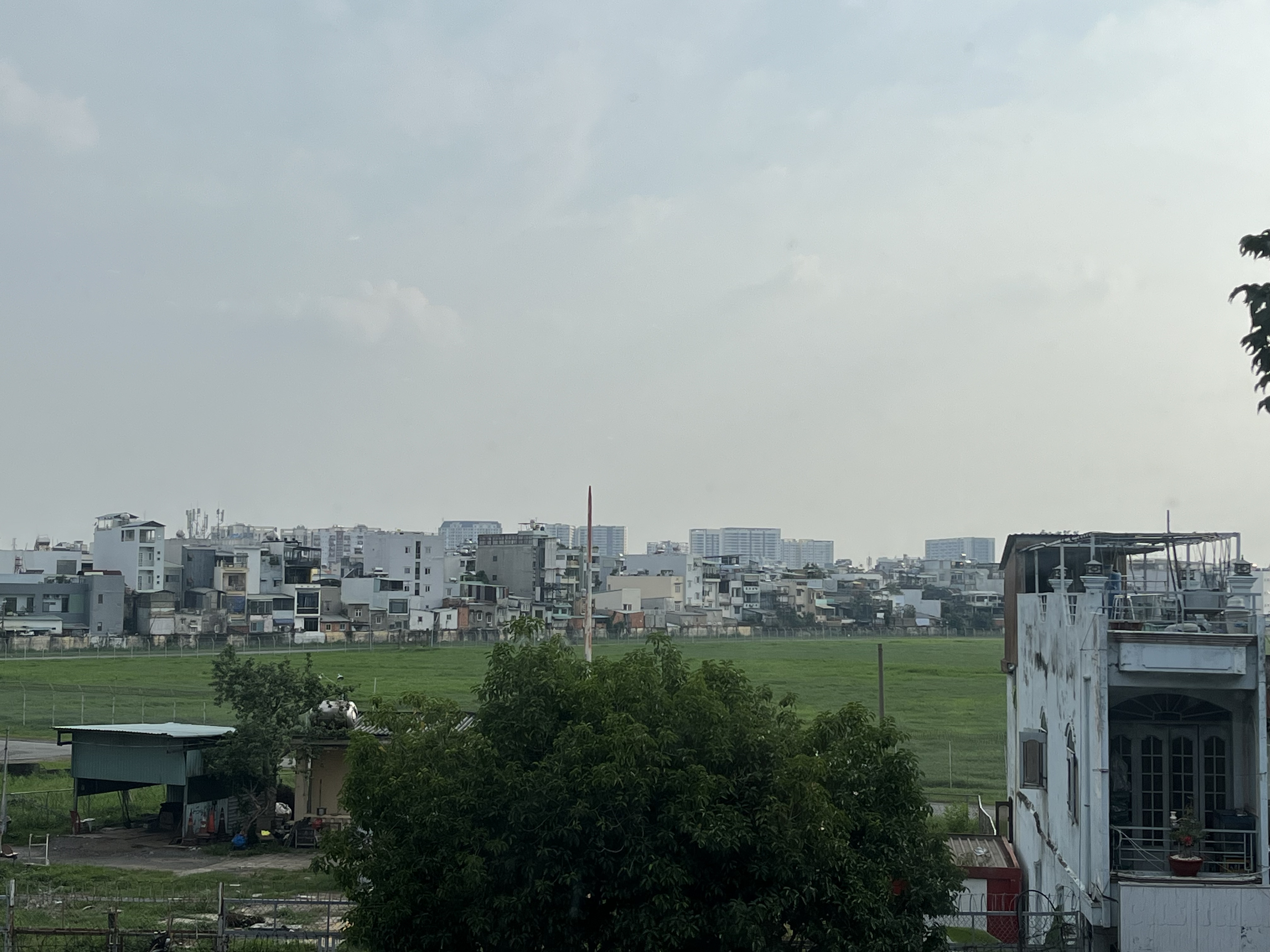
Tan Son Nhat International Airport Runway

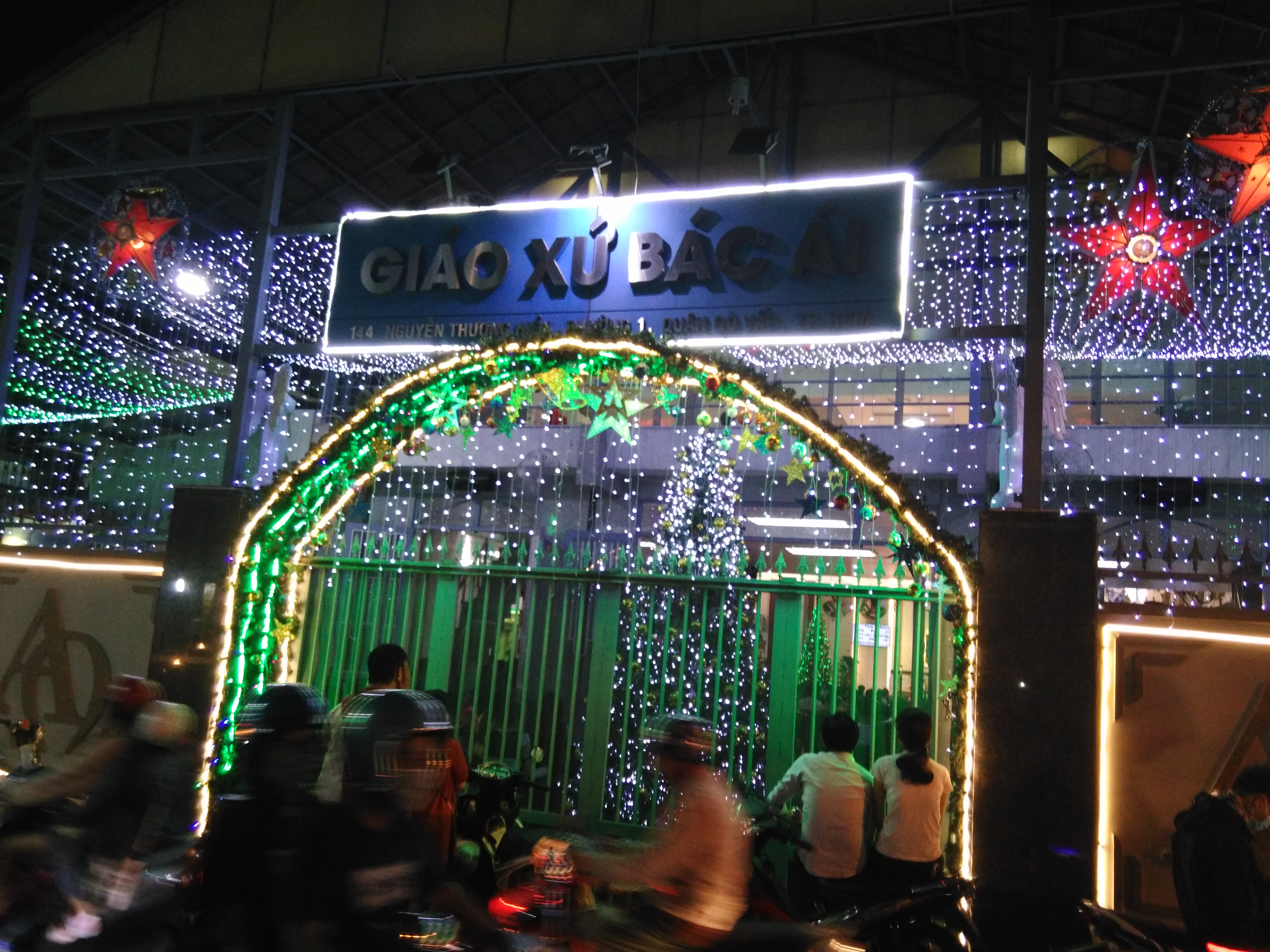
Church of Charity (Giáo xứ Bác Ái)

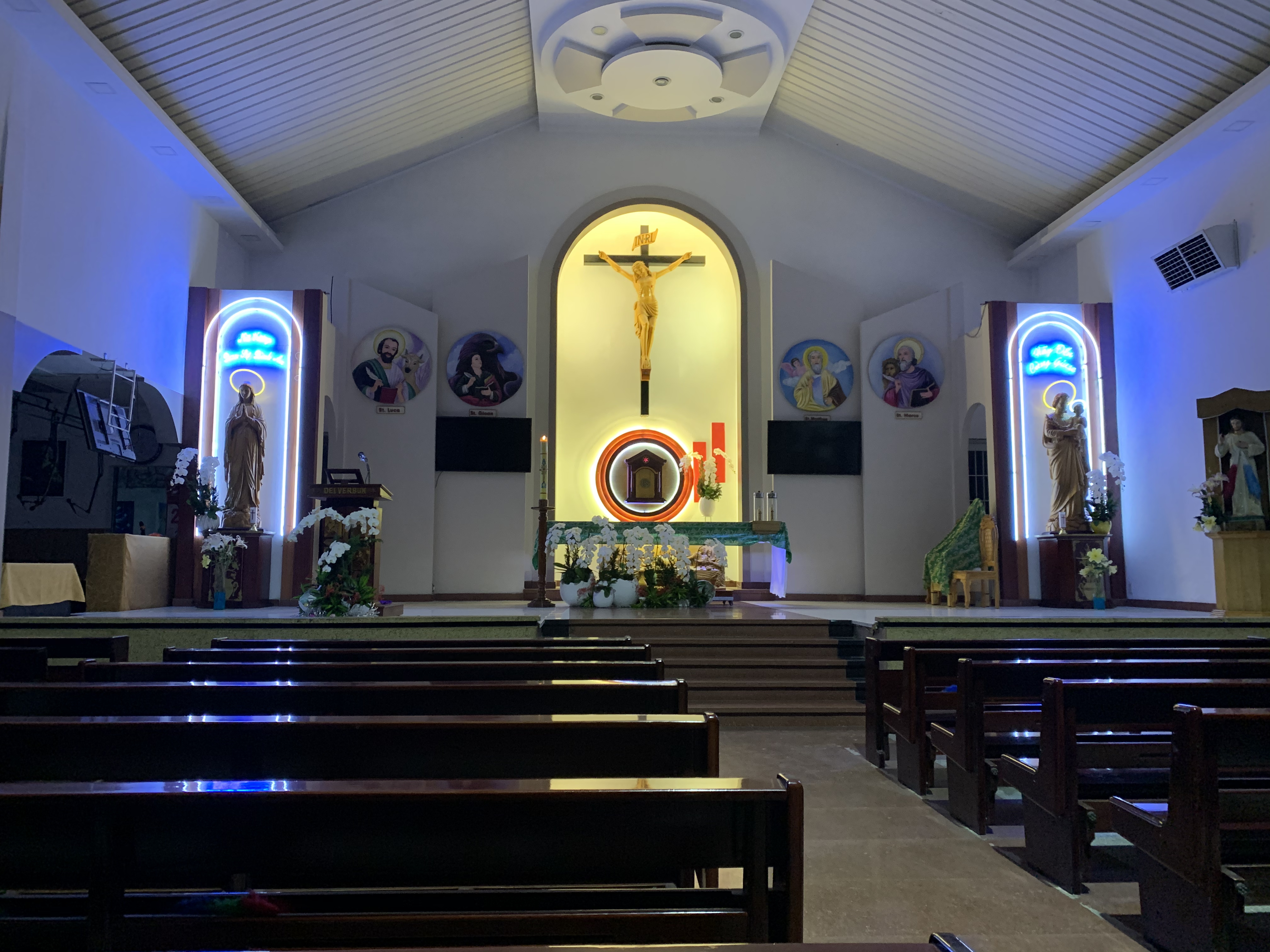
Inside the Church of Charity
