= Bình Tân =

Bình Tân may refer to several places in Vietnam, including:

- Bình Tân district, Ho Chi Minh City, an urban district of Ho Chi Minh City
- Bình Tân district, Vĩnh Long, a rural district of Vĩnh Long province
- Bình Tân, Ho Chi Minh City, a new ward established from part of Bình Tân district, Ho Chi Minh City
- Bình Tân, Đồng Nai, a commune of Đồng Nai province, from part of Phú Riềng district, Bình Phước province
- Bình Tân, La Gi, a ward of La Gi, Bình Thuận province
- Bình Tân, Đắk Lắk, a ward of Buôn Hồ
- Bình Tân, Long An, a commune of Kiến Tường
- Bình Tân, Bắc Bình, a commune of Bắc Bình district, Bình Thuận province
- Bình Tân, Quảng Ngãi, a commune of Bình Sơn district
- Bình Tân, Tiền Giang, a commune of Gò Công Tây district
- Bình Tân, Bình Phước, a commune of Phú Riềng district
- Bình Tân, Bình Định, a commune of Tây Sơn district

== See also ==
- Bình Tấn, a commune of Thanh Bình district, Đồng Tháp province
