= Tân Vĩnh Lộc =

Tân Vĩnh Lộc Xã Tân Vĩnh Lộc Vĩnh Lộc B
- Commune
- Interactive map of Tân Vĩnh Lộc
- Coordinates: 10°47′15″N 106°34′05″E
- Country: Vietnam
- Municipality: Ho Chi Minh City
- Established: June 16, 2025

Area
  - Total: 13.15 sq mi (34.05 km^{2})

Population (2024)
  - Total: 163,839
  - Density: 12,460/sq mi (4,812/km^{2})
- Time zone: UTC+07:00 (Indochina Time)
- Administrative code: 27604

Tân Vĩnh Lộc (Vietnamese: Xã Tân Vĩnh Lộc) is a commune of Ho Chi Minh City, Vietnam. It is one of the 168 new wards, communes and special zones of the city following the reorganization in 2025.

== History ==
On June 16, 2025, the National Assembly Standing Committee issued Resolution No. 1685/NQ-UBTVQH15 on the arrangement of commune-level administrative units of Ho Chi Minh City in 2025 (effective from June 16, 2025). Accordingly, the entire land area and population of Vĩnh Lộc B commune, part of Phạm Văn Hai commune of the former Bình Chánh district and a small portion of Tân Tạo ward of the former Bình Tân district will be integrated into a new commune named Tân Vĩnh Lộc (Clause 114, Article 1).
