= Franco-Vietnamese Hospital =

Coordinates: 10°43.940′N 106°43.110′E

FV Hospital Bệnh viện Pháp Việt
- Thomson Medical Group
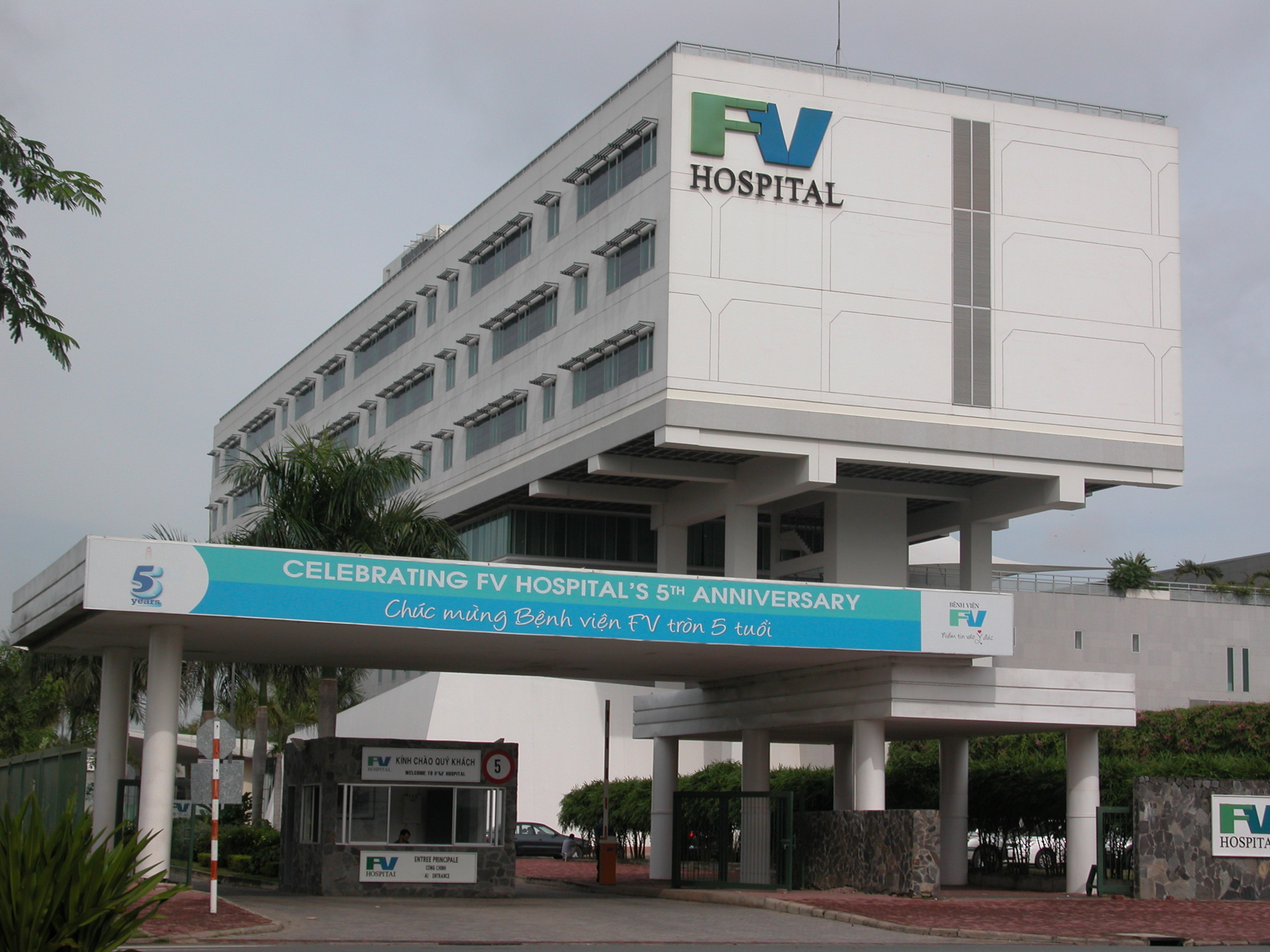

Geography
- Location: Medical Campus District, Phú Mỹ Hưng Urban Area, No. 6 Nguyễn Lương Bằng Avenue, Tân Mỹ, Ho Chi Minh City, Vietnam

Organisation
- Type: Tertiary/ Quaternary

Services
- Beds: 220

History
- Founded: 2003; 23 years ago

Links
- Website: www.fvhospital.com/en/
- Lists: Hospitals in Vietnam

Franco-Vietnamese Hospital or FV Hospital (Vietnamese: Bệnh viện Pháp Việt, Bệnh viện FV) is a hospital in the Medical Campus District of Phú Mỹ Hưng urban area in Tân Mỹ (District 7), Ho Chi Minh City, Vietnam. Opened in 2003 by a group of French physicians, its co-founder Jean-Marcel Guillon is CEO. The hospital has 150 full-time doctors and a number of staff of 1000 people, attending half a million patient visits in a year.

The hospital is known for its Hy Vọng Cancer Care Centre, obstetrics and gynecology, pediatric, ophthalmology, gastroenterology and hepatology, and radiology departments.

Founded by private sponsors, the FVH Medicine Vietnam association was established for free-of-charge medical care for children who require surgery. In December 2013, the FV Saigon Clinic was opened in the Bitexco Financial Tower in Bến Nghé, District 1, Ho Chi Minh City.

In January 2024, it was announced that Thomson Medical Group had completed the purchase of FV Hospital for $381.4 million.

In January 025, the clinic in Bitexco Financial Tower, District 1 was announced closing for rent.

== Accreditation ==
FV Hospital was accredited in March 2016, by the Joint Commission International (JCI) in the Hospital Program, becoming the second international hospital in Vietnam to be accredited by Joint Commission International.

== See also ==
- List of hospitals in Vietnam
