= Buôn Hồ (town) =

Coordinates: 12.8544°N 108.2703°E

- District-level town (Class-4)
- Buôn Hồ Town; Thị xã Buôn Hồ
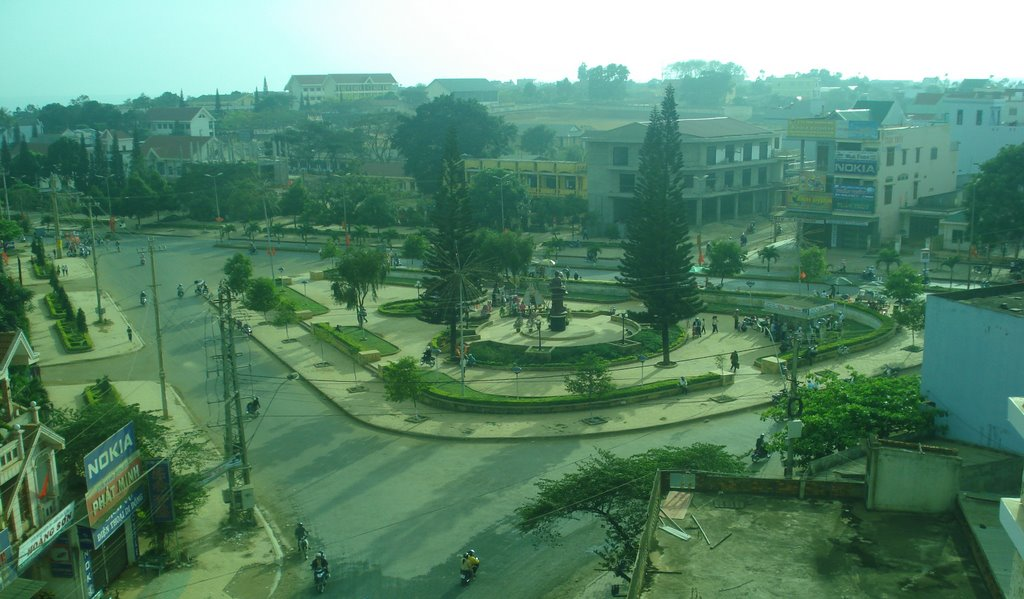

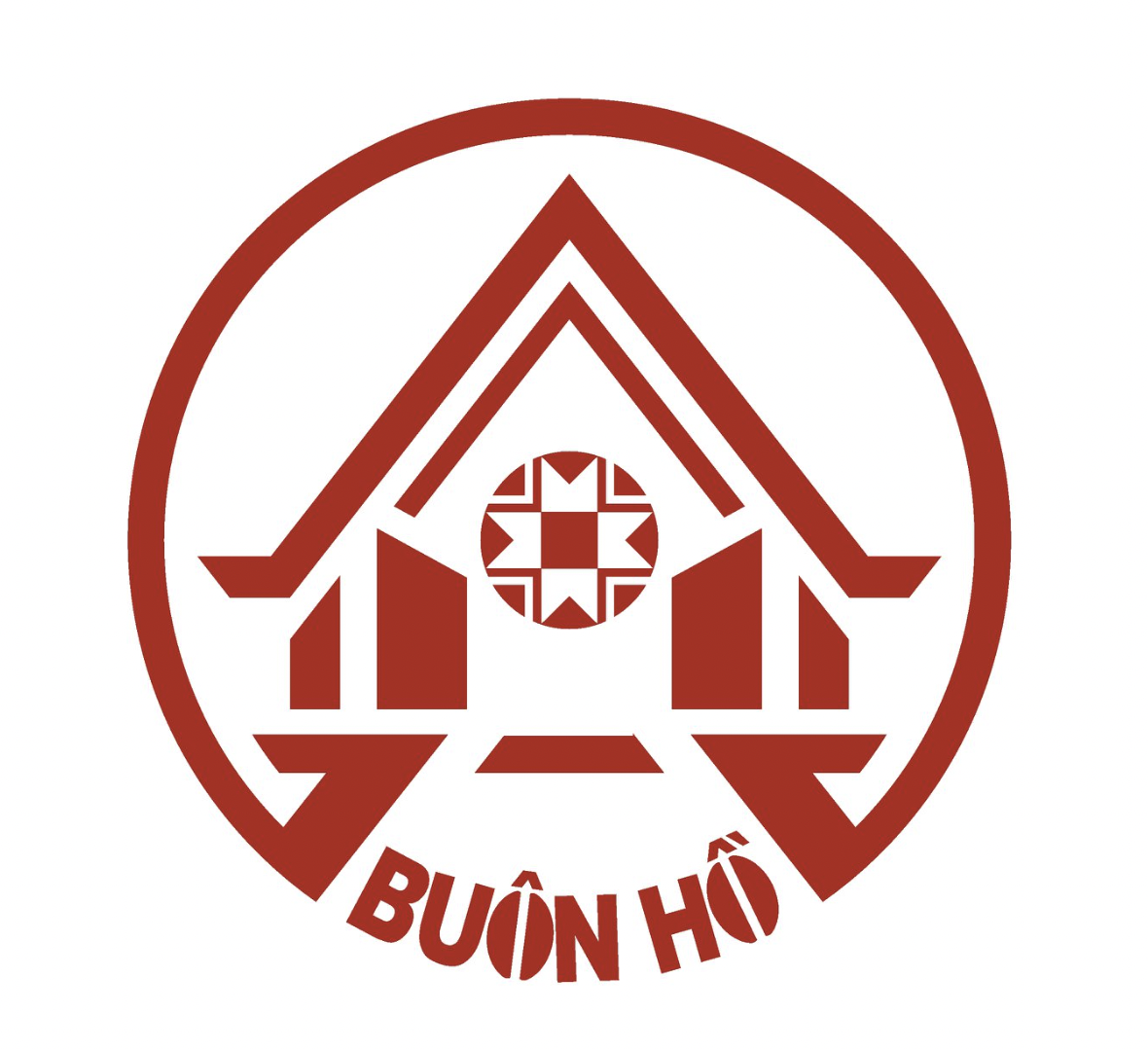
- Seal
- Interactive map of Buôn Hồ
- Location within Vietnam Location within Southeast Asia Location within Asia
- Country: Vietnam
- Province: Đắk Lắk
- Established: 23 December 2008

Area
  - Total: 282.06 km^{2} (108.90 sq mi)

Population (2019)
  - Total: 127,920
- Time zone: UTC+7 (Indochina Time)
- Website: www.buonho.daklak.gov.vn

Buôn Hồ is a former district-level town (thị xã) of Đắk Lắk province in the Central Highlands of Vietnam. Until December 2008, the town was the southern portion of Krông Búk District.

Buôn Hồ is subdivided into seven wards (phường) and five communes (xã):

- Wards: Đạt Hiếu, An Lạc, An Bình, Thiện An, Đoàn Kết, Thống Nhất, Bình Tân
- Communes: Ea Siên, Ea Drông, Ea Blang, Bình Thuận, Cư Bao

As of December 2008, Buôn Hồ had a population of 101,554. The district covers an area of 282.06 km^{2}.

== Climate ==
Climate data for Buôn Hồ, elevation 700 m (2,300 ft)
Month	Jan	Feb	Mar	Apr	May	Jun	Jul	Aug	Sep	Oct	Nov	Dec	Year
Record high °C (°F)	31.3 (88.3)	34.2 (93.6)	36.1 (97.0)	36.6 (97.9)	35.6 (96.1)	32.9 (91.2)	31.5 (88.7)	31.9 (89.4)	30.8 (87.4)	31.2 (88.2)	30.5 (86.9)	29.8 (85.6)	36.6 (97.9)
Mean daily maximum °C (°F)	24.1 (75.4)	26.8 (80.2)	29.4 (84.9)	30.9 (87.6)	30.0 (86.0)	28.2 (82.8)	27.5 (81.5)	27.1 (80.8)	27.1 (80.8)	26.3 (79.3)	24.9 (76.8)	23.3 (73.9)	27.1 (80.8)
Daily mean °C (°F)	18.8 (65.8)	20.4 (68.7)	22.6 (72.7)	24.3 (75.7)	24.3 (75.7)	23.5 (74.3)	22.9 (73.2)	22.7 (72.9)	22.6 (72.7)	22.0 (71.6)	20.8 (69.4)	19.1 (66.4)	22.0 (71.6)
Mean daily minimum °C (°F)	16.0 (60.8)	16.8 (62.2)	18.5 (65.3)	20.3 (68.5)	20.9 (69.6)	20.6 (69.1)	20.2 (68.4)	20.2 (68.4)	20.1 (68.2)	19.5 (67.1)	18.5 (65.3)	16.8 (62.2)	19.0 (66.2)
Record low °C (°F)	8.8 (47.8)	11.1 (52.0)	10.1 (50.2)	15.8 (60.4)	16.5 (61.7)	18.0 (64.4)	17.1 (62.8)	17.7 (63.9)	17.8 (64.0)	13.8 (56.8)	10.5 (50.9)	8.5 (47.3)	8.5 (47.3)
Average precipitation mm (inches)	5.3 (0.21)	6.2 (0.24)	19.6 (0.77)	88.6 (3.49)	189.6 (7.46)	204.4 (8.05)	191.8 (7.55)	261.4 (10.29)	260.6 (10.26)	190.5 (7.50)	110.4 (4.35)	29.6 (1.17)	1,558.2 (61.35)
Average rainy days	3.9	2.0	4.0	8.2	18.2	20.4	22.4	24.8	23.9	18.5	13.7	10.1	169.8
Average relative humidity (%)	84.4	79.8	76.4	76.1	81.6	86.4	88.3	89.8	89.6	89.3	88.9	88.1	84.9
Mean monthly sunshine hours	229.7	233.5	257.2	242.4	232.4	206.7	199.7	174.9	157.6	157.3	156.2	167.6	2,419.2
Source: Vietnam Institute for Building Science and Technology

== Notable residents ==
- Huỳnh Ngọc Tuấn, journalist.
- Huỳnh Thục Vy, journalist.
