= St. Paul's Hospital =

St. Paul's Hospital or St. Paul Hospital may refer to:

in Canada

- St. Paul's Hospital (Vancouver)
- St. Paul's Hospital (Saskatoon)

in Hong Kong

- St. Paul's Hospital (Hong Kong)

in the United States

- St. Paul Hospital in Dallas, Texas

in Vietnam

- Saint Paul Hospital in Hanoi
