= Chu Kim Đức =

Vietnamese architect

Chu Kim Duc
- Born: 1980 (age 44–45); Hanoi, Vietnam
- Occupation: Architect
- Awards: 100 Women BBC (2020)

Chu Kim Đức is a Vietnamese architect, co-founder and director of Think Playgrounds. Her work at Think Playgrounds focuses on ensuring children's right to play within the public realm.

== Early life and education ==
Đức was born in Hanoi, Vietnam, in 1980. After graduating as an architect from Hanoi University of Architecture with a degree in Urbanism in 2003, she studied the History of Gardens, Heritage and Landscape in Versailles in 2007 before returning to Vietnam.

While studying filmmaking at DocLab (Hanoi) in 2012, she met American photographer Judtih Hansen, who wanted to photograph playgrounds from around the world. Due to rapid urban development in Hanoi, outdoor play spaces for children are difficult to locate. In comparison to other similar high-density Asian cities with 39m^{2} of green space per inhabitant, Hanoi has only 11.2m^{2} per capita. Realizing the scarcity of playgrounds during a visit to Hanoi, Judith Hansen contacted Đức in hopes to donate a slide in collaboration with artist Nguyễn Ban Ga for children in Hanoi. While the project was never competed, this left Đức with the desire to continue working towards providing a playground for children in Hanoi.

== Career ==
=== Think Playgrounds ===
Think Playgrounds established as a volunteer group in 2014, founded by Chu Kim Đức and journalist Nguyễn Tiêu Quốc Đạt. When they started their work, there was a lack of free playgrounds with proper equipment in Hanoi, which they believed to have a negative effect on childhood development.

Their process of construction engages local people to build a connection between a public space and the nearby residents. Đức recounts that the most difficult aspect of building a playground is ensuring the local users have the capacity to maintain it.

To further educate about climate change and other environmental problems, most of the materials used in the playgrounds come from recycled materials such as thrown away tires, timber, steel and plastic. By repurposing these materials into slides, zip lines, jungle gyms and other equipment, Đức believes that the materials have a stronger impact on child-like exploration and their senses. This speaks to a similar level of ‘outdoor risky play’ first introduced through Adventure playgrounds by landscape architect Carl Theodor Sørensen, in Denmark, 1943.

Their first project was constructed in 2014 in Bai Giua, Vietnam, a low-income residential area along the Red River in the suburbs of Hanoi. In collaboration with the community, they installed swings, slides, and seesaws in a vacant lot within the neighbourhood.

They hold an event called ‘PlayDay’ which gives children a chance to play and immerse themselves in nature, while simultaneously raising community awareness on the importance of play. The launch of PlayDay was a 2-day event hosted at the American Club in Hanoi in November, 2014. Workshops for adults were held on the first day, teaching them how to build a pop-up playground which was then explored by children on the second day.

In 2016, Think Playgrounds was registered as a social enterprise, operating in two distinct domains of activity, including commercial and non-commercial projects. This structure reflects the unique condition in which the Vietnamese Government is unwilling to accept NGOs and other non-profit organizations that aim to solve public problems. Their endeavours range from fixed public parks that are intended to reactivate underutilized dead spaces within residential areas, to mobile playground structures which temporarily transform a specific place by introducing alternative play structures.

As of 2018, their work began to extend into the broader context of play, hosting several ‘Play Campaigns,’ where international experts were invited to hold conferences and workshops in Hanoi (including Bianca Ergas from KuKuk Kutler, Germany and Deborah Gentès from Jouer pour vivre, France, in 2018, and the Japan Foundation, Tokyo Play, in 2019). Through collaboration with foreign and local organizations, communities, and artists, paired with funding from domestic and international sources, they have created over 200 public playgrounds for children, and hosted over 30 public events in Hanoi and Ho Chi Minh City, since establishing Think Playgrounds.

Đức's more recent work involves the design of therapeutic playgrounds for children with disabilities and special considerations for the Vietnam National Children's Hospital, as well as an inclusive playground for children with Visual impairments at Nguyen Dinh Chieu Secondary School. Additionally, they are exploring further research on recycled, low-carbon materials, including ecological bricks and roofing sheets from milk cartons, and their implementation in children's playgrounds.

== Recognition ==
- 2016 – Funding from Urban95 Challenge, Bernard Van Leers Foundation.
- 2017 – First Prize, Raising Awareness on Green City Solutions in Vietnam, Embassy of Denmark.
- 2018 – Third place, The Art of Recycle Awards, UNESCO, Vietnam.
- 2019 – Joint Project of the Year, Ashui Award, Vietnam.
- 2020 – BBC List of 100 Women, recognized for her work promoting children's right to play in Vietnam.
- 2022 – Winner, Asia Pacific Social Innovation Partnership Award (APSIPA), Social Prosperity Category.
