= Bạch Mai =

Bạch Mai Ward Phường Bạch Mai
- Ward (Class-II)
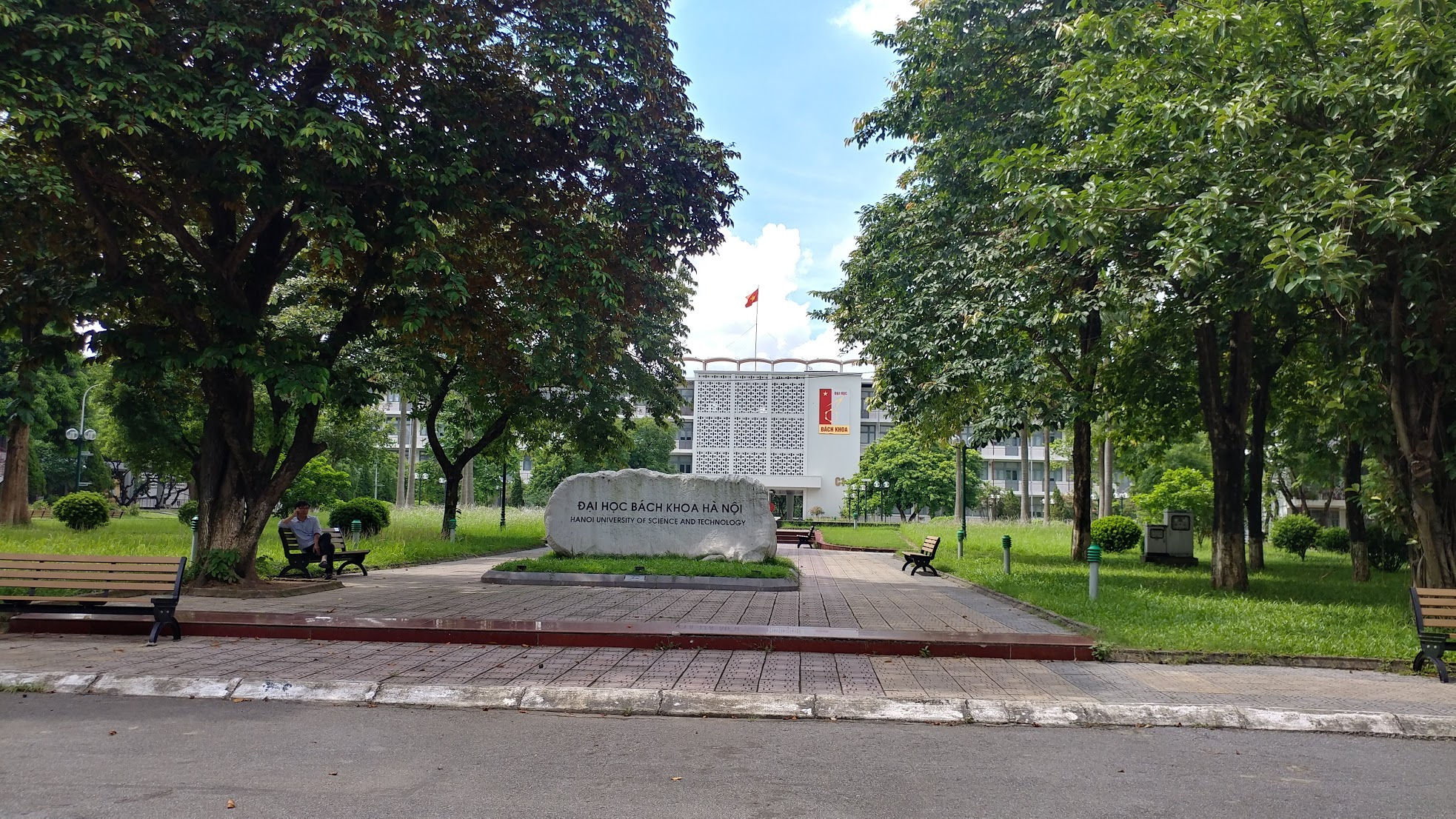
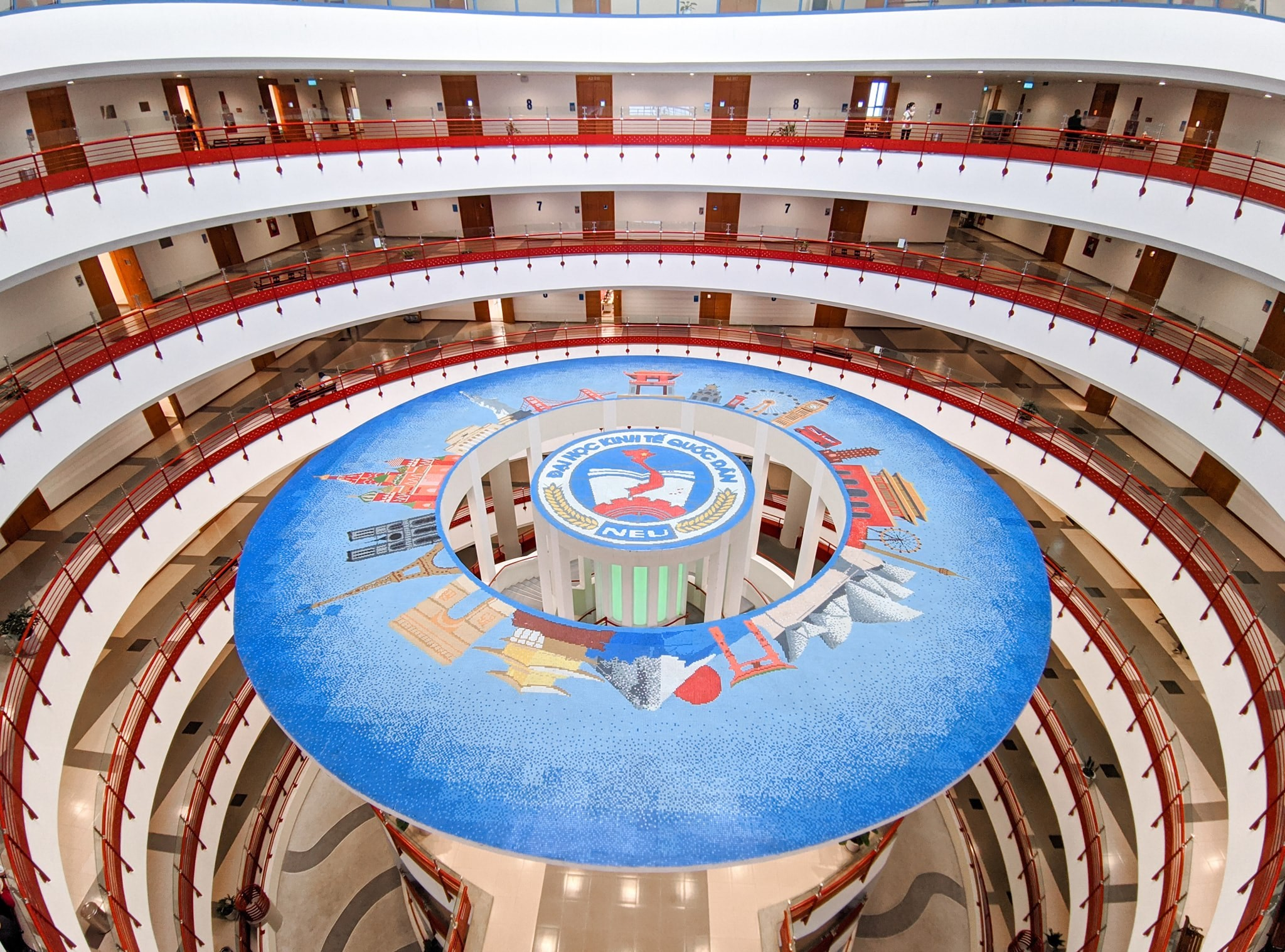
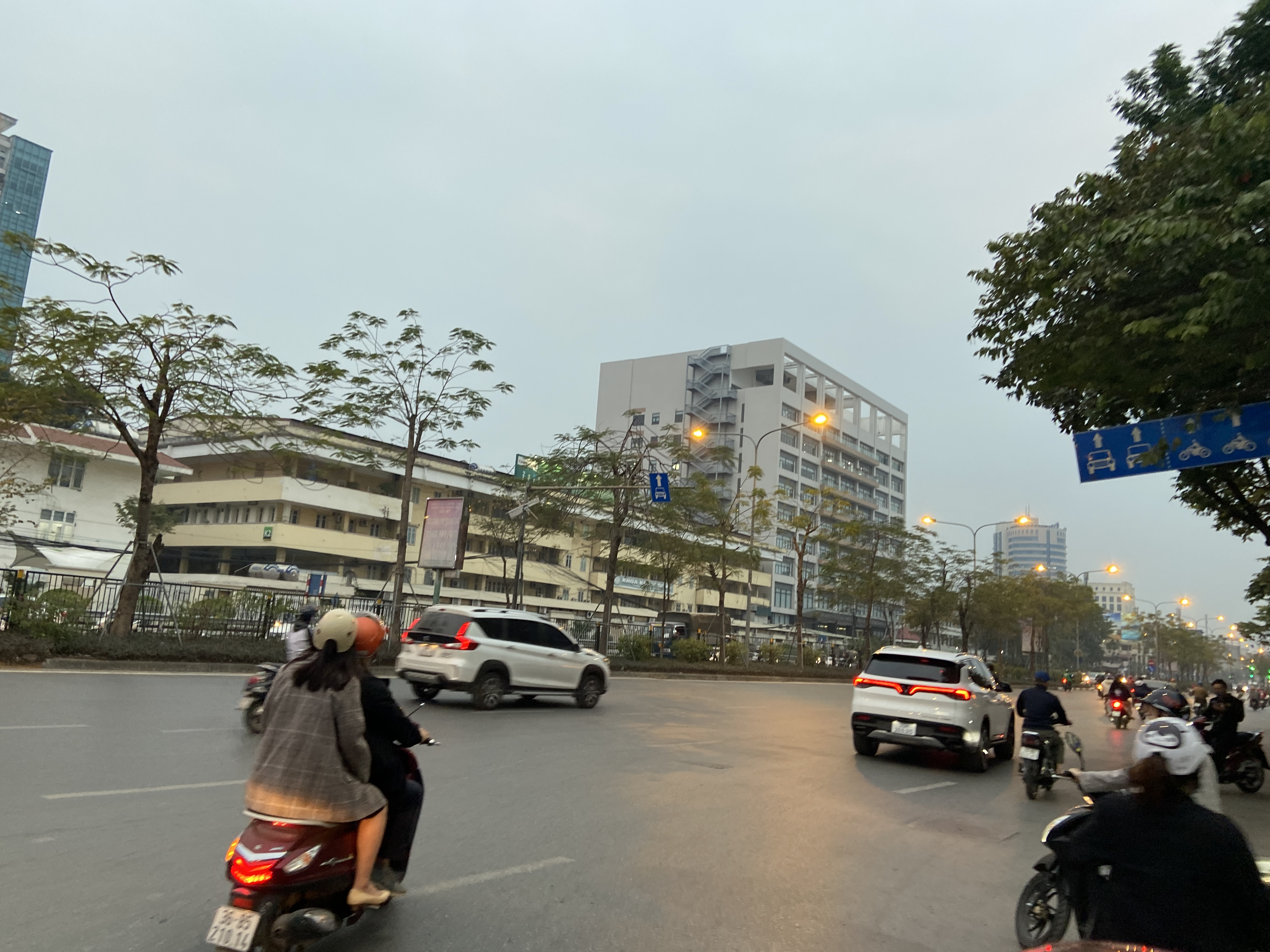
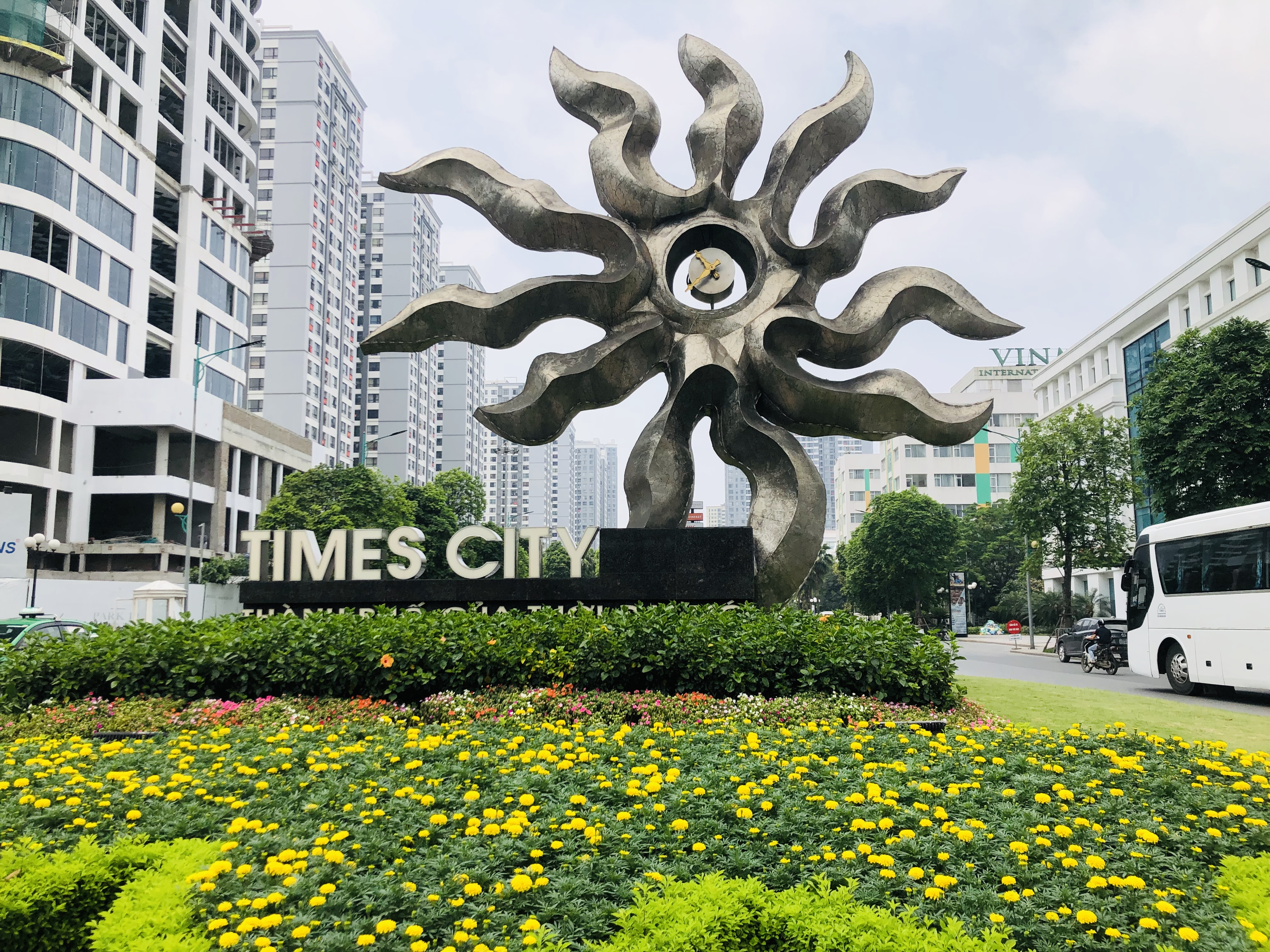
- From top, left to right: University of Science and Technology, National Economics University, Bạch Mai Hospital, and Vinhomes Times City.

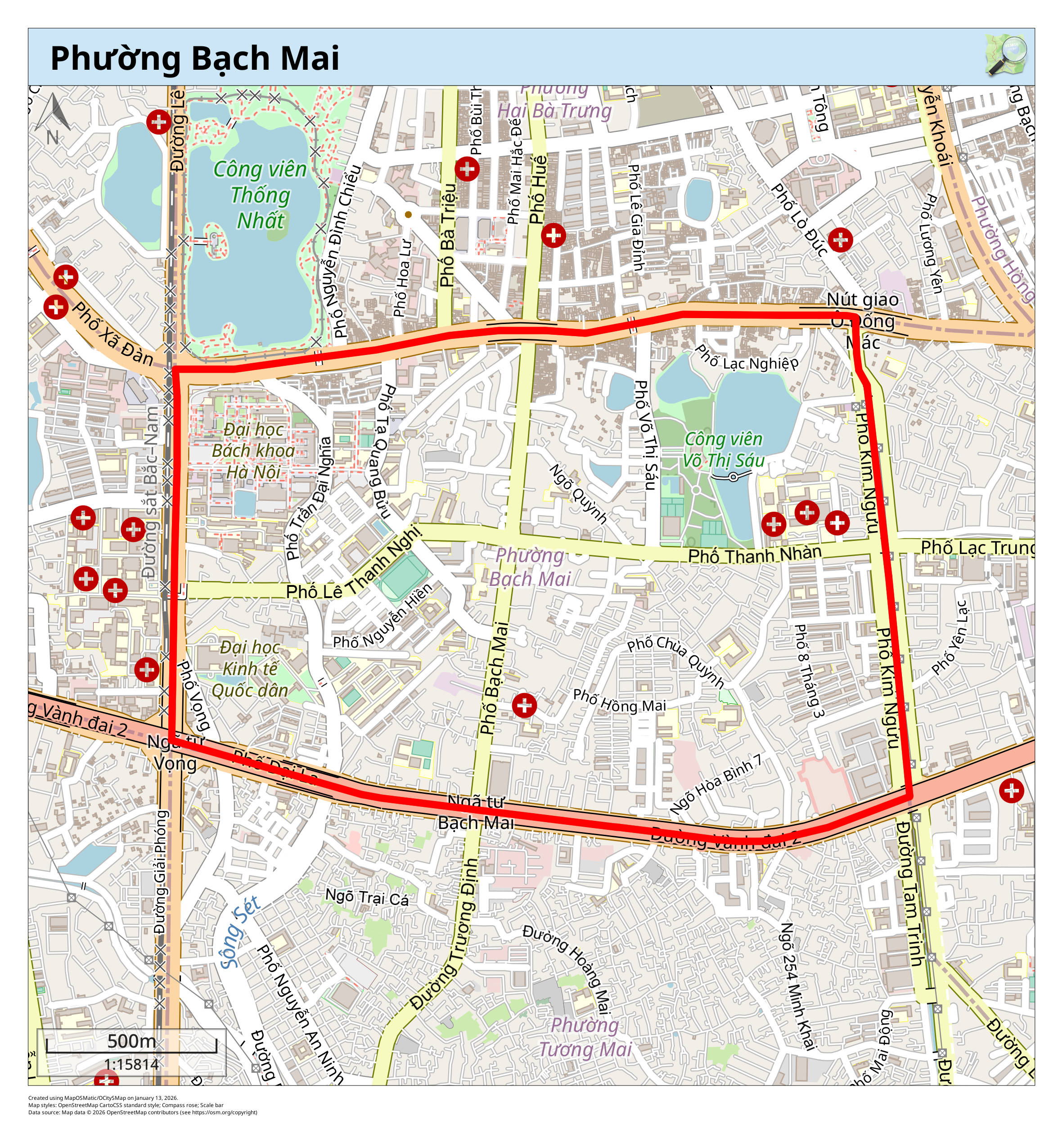
- Bạch Mai map
- Country: Vietnam
- Region: Red River Delta
- Municipality: Hà Nội
- Establishment: May 31, 1961 (ward)
- Central hall: No.33, Đại Cồ Việt Boulevard, Bạch Mai Ward

Government
  - Type: Ward-level authority
  - People Committee's Chairman: Nguyễn Thị Thu Hiền
  - People Council's Chairman: Trần Quyết Thắng
  - Front Committee's Chairman: Tạ Thị Thanh Huyền
  - Party Committee's Secretary: Trần Quyết Thắng

Area
  - Total: 2.95 km^{2} (1.14 sq mi)

Population (July 1, 2025)
  - Total: 129,571
  - Density: 43,900/km^{2} (114,000/sq mi)
  - Ethnicities: Kinh; Tanka; Others
- Time zone: UTC+7 (Indochina Time)
- ZIP code: 10000–11618 (Note: An official code from December 31, 2023, to present.)
- Climate: Cwa
- Website: Bachmai.Hanoi.gov.vn; Bachmai.Hanoi.dcs.vn

Bạch Mai (IPA: [ɓa̰ʔjk˨˩:maːj˧˧]) is a ward of Hanoi, Vietnam. As of 2025, it had a population of 129,571.

== History ==
=== Middle Ages ===
The name Bạch Mai comes from the Hán Nôm name for the local flowers, Prunus mume (白梅).

Some documents state that Bạch Mai was located along the Imperial Road from Đông Kinh, the capital city, which is why it was impacted more by administrative reforms than other places. The area changed its administrative affiliation several times before the 18th century. It has been part of Thọ Xương Rural District and Thanh Đàm Rural District. The lack of fixed administrative status is thought to have resulted from human migration because of natural disasters or famine.

According to five books (Lê quý dật sử, Lê quý kỷ sự, Sơn cư tạp thuật, Tang thương ngẫu lục, and Vũ trung tùy bút), during the chaotic times of Đàng Ngoài in the middle of the 18th century, Bạch Mai was a fishing hamlet in Hồng Mai Commune, Kim Liên Canton, Thanh Đàm Rural District, Thường Tín Prefecture, Sơn Nam Thượng Garrison. It was sometimes called K'Mo or Kẻ Mơ (Hán Nôm: 古梅) during that time. According to folklore, Bạch Mai was involved in pork processing and trading, so it was also known by the nickname Mơ Thịt.

=== Nineteenth century ===
From the first administrative reform of Emperor Minh Mệnh in 1831, Hồng Mai was renamed Hồng Mai Commune and was located in Kim Liên Canton, Thanh Trì Rural District, Thường Tín Prefecture, Hà Nội Province, Bắc Thành Region of Imperial Annam. In 1848, Hồng Mai changed its name to Hoàng Mai Commune to avoid containing the middle name of Emperor Tự Đức. (Note: Nguyễn Phước Hồng Nhậm.)

In 1899, the Government of French Tonkin dissolved Kim Liên Canton to establish Hoàng Mai Rural District, which temporarily belonged to the suburbs of Hanoi.

=== Twentieth century ===
In 1915, the Hoàng Mai area was transferred and merged into the Hoàn Long Rural District of Hà Đông Province.

Around 1942, Hoàng Mai area was re-merged into the Hanoi Special Town (Note: Hà Nội đặc biệt đại lý.) as the southern part of District VII.

On May 31, 1961, the Government Council of the Democratic Republic of Vietnam issued Decision 78-CP on the division of urban and suburban areas of Hanoi City. Accordingly, District VII was dissolved into two zones: (Note: "Khu" was equivalent to later "quận" (urban district).) Hai Bà Trưng (north) and Hoàng Mai (south). Afterwards, Bạch Mai Little Zone was established as the southern part of Hai Bà Trưng Zone.

In June 1981, Hai Bà Trưng Zone was renamed Hai Bà Trưng Urban District. Therefore, Bạch Mai L. Z. became Bạch Mai Ward.

=== Twenty-first century ===
On January 1, 2025, the area of Bạch Mai was doubled when it was merged with Quỳnh Lôi Ward.

On June 16, 2025, for the project to arrange and merge administrative units, the National Assembly Standing Committee issued Resolution 1656/NQ-UBTVQH15 on the re-arrangement of commune/ward-level administrative units in the Hanoian area. According to Clause 6 & 8 of Article 1 (Note: Khoản 6 và 8, Điều 1.) in this document, Bạch Mai Ward was to be expanded again, based on the merger of:

- The three wards Bạch Mai, Bách Khoa, and Quỳnh Mai from former Hai Bà Trưng District.
- Part of two Hai Bà Trưng wards, Minh Khai and Thanh Nhàn.
- Four Hoàng Mai wards: Đồng Tâm, Lê Đại Hành, Phương Mai, and Trương Định.

This administrative unit has officially been operated directly under the Hanoi City People's Committee since July 1, 2025, in order to replace the newly dissolved districts of Hai Bà Trưng and Hoàng Mai.

== Geography ==
=== Demography ===
According to the statistical yearbook of Hanoi, Bạch Mai Ward had a population of 129,571 in 2025.

=== Climate ===
Climate data for Bạch Mai Ward
Month	Jan	Feb	Mar	Apr	May	Jun	Jul	Aug	Sep	Oct	Nov	Dec	Year
Record high °C (°F)	33.3 (91.9)	35.1 (95.2)	37.2 (99.0)	41.5 (106.7)	42.8 (109.0)	41.8 (107.2)	40.8 (105.4)	39.7 (103.5)	37.4 (99.3)	36.6 (97.9)	36.0 (96.8)	31.9 (89.4)	42.8 (109.0)
Mean daily maximum °C (°F)	19.8 (67.6)	20.6 (69.1)	23.2 (73.8)	27.7 (81.9)	31.9 (89.4)	33.4 (92.1)	33.4 (92.1)	32.6 (90.7)	31.5 (88.7)	29.2 (84.6)	25.7 (78.3)	22.0 (71.6)	27.6 (81.7)
Daily mean °C (°F)	16.6 (61.9)	17.7 (63.9)	20.3 (68.5)	24.2 (75.6)	27.6 (81.7)	29.3 (84.7)	29.4 (84.9)	28.7 (83.7)	27.7 (81.9)	25.3 (77.5)	21.9 (71.4)	18.3 (64.9)	23.9 (75.0)
Mean daily minimum °C (°F)	14.5 (58.1)	15.8 (60.4)	18.4 (65.1)	21.9 (71.4)	24.8 (76.6)	26.4 (79.5)	26.5 (79.7)	26.1 (79.0)	25.2 (77.4)	22.8 (73.0)	19.3 (66.7)	15.8 (60.4)	21.5 (70.7)
Record low °C (°F)	2.7 (36.9)	5.0 (41.0)	7.0 (44.6)	9.8 (49.6)	15.4 (59.7)	20.0 (68.0)	21.0 (69.8)	20.9 (69.6)	16.1 (61.0)	12.4 (54.3)	6.8 (44.2)	5.1 (41.2)	2.7 (36.9)
Average rainfall mm (inches)	22.5 (0.89)	24.6 (0.97)	47.0 (1.85)	91.8 (3.61)	185.4 (7.30)	253.3 (9.97)	280.1 (11.03)	309.4 (12.18)	228.3 (8.99)	140.7 (5.54)	66.7 (2.63)	20.2 (0.80)	1,670.1 (65.75)
Average rainy days	9.5	11.4	15.9	13.7	14.6	14.8	16.6	16.5	13.2	9.7	6.8	5.2	147.9
Average relative humidity (%)	79.9	82.5	84.5	84.7	81.1	80.0	80.7	82.7	81.0	78.5	77.1	76.2	80.7
Mean monthly sunshine hours	68.7	48.1	45.5	87.4	173.7	167.0	181.1	163.0	162.4	150.3	131.6	113.0	1,488.5
Source 1: Vietnam Institute for Building Science and Technology
Source 2: Extremes (Note: All-time record high; Vietnamnet.vn (May record high and January record low only), Vietnamnet.vn (June record high only), Imh.ac.vn (August record high only), Nchmf.gov.vn, January record high, November record high, April and May record low in The Yearbook of Indochina)
