= Thuc =

Thục is a Vietnamese given name and surname. People with this name include:

== Given name ==
- Dương Thị Thục (1868–1944), empress dowager of Vietnam
- Ngô Đình Thục (1897–1984), Vietnamese bishop
- Mai Thuc (1950–2018), Vietnamese writer

== Surname ==
- An Dương Vương (personal name Thục Phán, r. 257–179 BC), king of Âu Lạc and founder of the Thục dynasty

== See also ==
- Thuc., an abbreviation for Thucydides
