= List of hospitals in Vietnam =

This is a list of hospitals in Vietnam.

== Hanoi ==
=== Public ===
- Bach Mai Hospital, largest in Hanoi
- Mai Huong Hospital
- Saint Paul Hospital
- Thanh Nhan Hospital
- Viet Duc Hospital, largest centre of surgery in Vietnam.
- Vietnam National Children's Hospital
- 108 Hospital (or Army Central Hospital 108)
- Hanoi International American Hospital (construction abandoned)

=== Private ===
- L'Hôpital Français De Hanoï

== Red-river Delta ==
=== Quảng Ninh Province ===
- Vietnam-Sweden Hospital

=== Thái Nguyên Province ===
- Thai Nguyen Central General Hospital (or Thai Nguyen National General Hospital)

== Central Vietnam ==
- Hue Central Hospital
- Da Nang Hospital

== Ho Chi Minh City ==
=== Public ===
==== Administered by Vietnam department of health ====
- Cho Ray Hospital, the largest hospital in Ho Chi Minh City

==== Administered by Vietnam Department of Defense ====
- 175 Central Military Hospital

=== Private ===
- City International Hospital
- Gia An 115 Hospital
- Franco-Vietnamese Hospital (Joint Commission accredited)
- Prima Saigon Medical Center
