= Mai Thuc =

Vietnamese writer and journalist

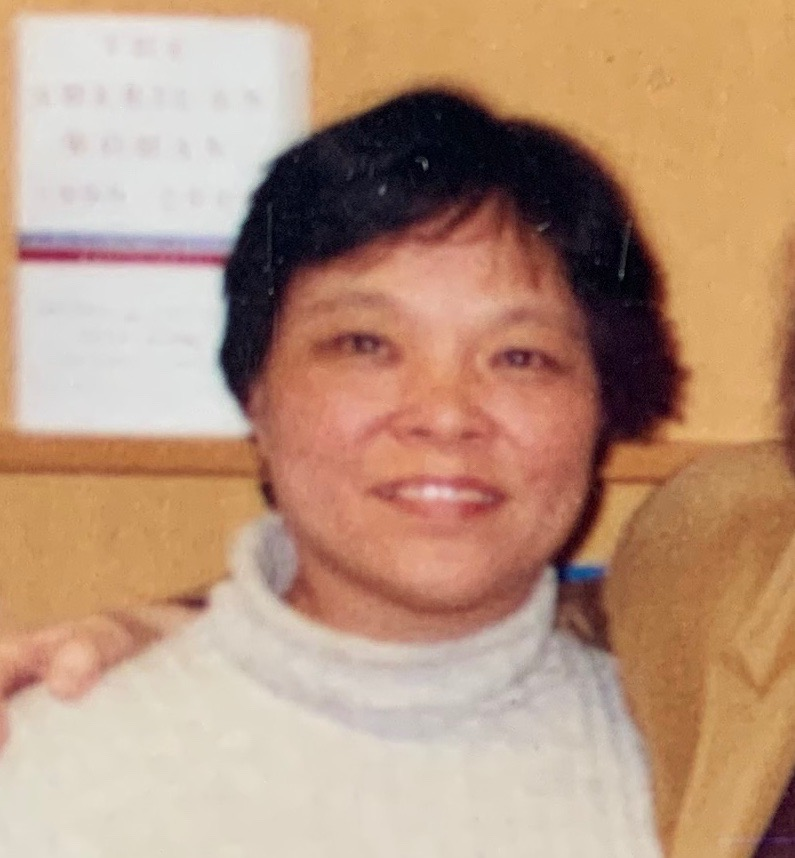
- Mai Thuc during her visit to United Methodist Women, Washington, DC, 2000
- Born: 15 March 1950
- Died: 24 June 2018 (aged 68)
- Occupations: Writer, journalist
- Notable work: Tinh Hoa Hà Nội (Hanoi Quintessence), (journalistic essays), Culture & Information Publishing, 1998, 2000, 2004, 2006

Mai Thuc (Vietnamese: Mai Thục) (née Mai Thị Thục; 15 March 1950 – 24 June 2018) was a Vietnamese writer and journalist, who was most known for her works on Vietnam history, its people, and culture. She was the Editor-in-chief of Hanoi Women's Newspaper (1995–2003) and later in her retirement years a part-time lecturer in Hanoi Culturology at Thang Long University, Hanoi.

Mai Thuc, in her own words: "Văn dĩ tải Đạo. Tôi cầm bút cùng mọi người hành trình trên con đường Chân Thiện Mỹ." (Words enlighten. I, with my pen, journey with others towards Truth - Kindness - Aesthetics.)

== Life, education, and career ==
Mai Thuc was born in Yen Phuc, Y Yen, Nam Dinh on March 15, 1950. Her father was a medical doctor and her mother a housewife. In a wartime Vietnam against the French, being the eldest child, she started her nursing education early to be able to work to help out the family. She then worked at Uong Bi hospital (now Vietnam-Sweden Hospital, Uong Bi, Quang Ninh), under the bombings, this time during the Vietnam War.

During 1975 - early 1980s, she worked at the Ministry of Power and Coal (now Ministry of Industry and Trade) and at the same time pursued her college degree at the Department of Literature, Vietnam National University, Hanoi. Her thesis's title is "Light and Dark in Les Miserables by Victor Hugo", supervised by Professor of French Literature Do Duc Hieu.

From mid 1980s, she joined the daily Hanoimoi (New Hanoi) as a reporter and editor, then the Deputy Head of Social and Cultural issues Department of the newspaper. She was among the founders of Hanoimoi Chu Nhat (New Hanoi Sunday), a new production of Hanoimoi.

In 1994, Mai Thuc started her position at Hanoi Women's Newspaper as the Deputy Editor-in-chief, and from 1995 as the Editor-in-chief until her retirement in 2003. She expanded the newspaper's fund "For Women and Children in difficulties" ("Quỹ Vì Phụ nữ và trẻ em hoạn nạn”). During her 10 years in charge of the newspaper, she was known as a determined, passionate leader, standing up for social justice and gender equality. In an interview, she said she believed a newspaper for women should have the mission of protecting and empowering women, especially those most disadvantaged. Mai Thuc also believed that women's social status greatly depends on every woman preserving her dignity and resilience, and cultivating her education and knowledge.

In 2000, she was invited by the US Department of State to visit the United States under its premier professional exchange program International Visitor Leadership Program (IVLP).

During her later years, Mai Thuc kept an active professional life, continued writing and publishing, with a tranquil heart, embracing the fleeting nature of life. She provided consultancy work to several newspapers and NGOs, while being a part-time lecturer in Hanoi Culturology at Thang Long University, Hanoi, and also a speaker at educational events.

Mai Thuc died on June 24, 2018, in Hanoi, aged 68. She is survived by her husband Vu Thuy and her two children Tuan Minh and Mai Trang.

== Works ==
Mai Thuc's journalistic work consists of hundreds of newspaper articles. As a journalist, she spoke with unwavering honesty and courage through her reports and features, giving voice to justice and standing by the vulnerable. Her hard work and dedication earned her numerous honours from the Vietnam Journalists Association and the Hanoi Journalists Association.

As a writer, Mai Thuc set her soul free through poems, short stories, and historical novels. Her books are available in libraries in many countries. Of her books, many of which have been republished and reprinted, Tinh hoa Hà Nội (Hanoi quintessence), a collection of essays recapturing the essence of Hanoi life, its people, history and culture, is highly acclaimed. Tinh hoa Hà Nội is “the radiance of vitality from a humble Hanoi and an intellectual Hanoi, continuing the legacy of a cultured Hanoi”. The essays were likened to poems about Hanoi: "poems, in their resonant rhythms; poems, in the way colours, sounds, fragrances, sweetness, and light harmonise; poems, because they express the spiritual, the mysterious, the sacred essence of Earth, Sky, and Humanity — all steeped in Eastern philosophy: of intuition, of compassion, of gentle and humane love."

In 2001, a documentary about Mai Thuc's life and her book "Tinh hoa Hà Nội" was produced by Vietnam Television.

In 2004, Vương miện lưu đày (Crown in Exile) — a historical novel, was awarded the Second Prize by the Alliance of Arts and Literature Associations of Vietnam's Annual Prizes 2004.

- Điển tích Văn học (in chung cùng Đỗ Đức Hiểu - co-authored with Do Duc Hieu), NXB Khoa học xã hội, 1990; NXB Văn học, 2006.
- Hà Nội sắc hương, (Journalistic Essays) NXB Hội nhà văn, 1994; NXB Văn hóa Thông tin, 2004.
- Hương đất Hà Thành, (Journalistic Essays), NXB Lao Động, 1996; NXB Văn hóa Thông tin, 2004.
- Đi tìm miền thương nhớ, (Journalistic Essays), NXB Lao Động, 1998.
- Tinh Hoa Hà Nội, (Hanoi quintessence), (Journalistic Essays), NXB Văn hóa Thông tin, 1998, 2000, 2004, 2006.
- Chuyển kiếp (Metamorphosis) (Tập truyện ngắn, Short stories), NXB Hội Nhà văn, 2000.
- Còn tình yêu ở lại (Love lives on), (Tiểu thuyết, Novel), NXB Hội Nhà văn 2001; NXB Thanh Niên 2006.
- Vương miện lưu đày (Crown in Exile), (Tiểu thuyết lịch sử, Historical Novel), NXB Văn hóa Thông tin, 2004. Tác phẩm được Ủy ban Toàn quốc, Liên hiệp các Hội Văn học-Nghệ thuật Việt Nam tặng giải B năm 2004.
- Mây trắng tình yêu (Clouds of Love), (Tiểu thuyết lịch sử, Historical Novel). Paris: Việt Văn mới (French-Viet Literary Group), 2005. Link.
- Lệ Chi Viên (Tiểu thuyết, Historical Novel), NXB Văn hóa Thông tin, 2010.
- Những chuyện tình lịch sử (Tập truyện ngắn, Historical Short stories), NXB Phụ nữ, 2011.
- Đi Tìm Tổ Tiên Việt (In search for Vietnamese ancestry) (Monograph), NXB Văn hóa Thông tin, 2014.
