= Mai Hương Hospital =

Coordinates: 20.9988°N 105.8513°E

Geography
- Location: Hanoi, Vietnam

Organisation
- Type: Specialist
- Affiliated university: University of Melbourne

Services
- Speciality: Mental health

Links
- Lists: Hospitals in Vietnam

Mai Huong Hospital (or Mai Huong Day Psychiatric Hospital) - a hospital in Hanoi (Vietnam) specialized in mental health.

The hospital provides psychotherapy, medical treatment, consultations, rehabilitation services and is sponsored by Centre for International Mental Health of the University of Melbourne.

The programs for free mental check-ups and counselling for students and schoolchildren are regularly held.

== See also ==
- List of hospitals in Vietnam.
