= Thai Nguyen Central General Hospital =

Thai Nguyen National General Hospital

Geography
- Location: 479 Luong Ngoc Quyen road, Phan Dinh Phung, Thái Nguyên, Thái Nguyên Province, Vietnam
- Coordinates: 21.587978°N 105.830937°E

Organisation
- Type: General

Services
- Beds: 800

History
- Founded: 1951

Links
- Website: www.bvdktuthainguyen.gov.vn
- Lists: Hospitals in Vietnam

Thai Nguyen National General Hospital (TCGH), established in 1951, was the first Northern mountainous and midland hospital in Vietnam. The hospital provides 800 beds.
