= Thanh Nhàn Hospital =

Geography
- Location: Thanh Nhan ward, Hai Ba Trung district, Hanoi, Vietnam
- Coordinates: 21.003806°N 105.859375°E

Organisation
- Type: General

Links
- Website: thanhnhanhospital.vn
- Lists: Hospitals in Vietnam

Thanh Nhan Hospital (Vietnamese: Bệnh viện Thanh Nhàn) is a large hospital in Thanh Nhan ward, Hai Ba Trung district, Hanoi, Vietnam. Located in a labour quarter, it is regarded as a hospital for workers and the poor in Hanoi. It was recently updated, creating two more adjunct hospitals.
