= Gia An 115 Hospital =

Private hospital in Vietnam

- Hoa Lam-Shangri-La Healthcare Techpark

Geography
- Location: No.5 Road 17A, An Lạc Ward, Bình Tân district, Ho Chi Minh City, Vietnam
- Coordinates: 10°44′25.6″N 106°36′28.1″E

Organisation
- Care system: Private
- Type: General
- Network: People 115 Hospital, City International Hospital

Services
- Emergency department: Yes
- Beds: 367

Helipads
- Helipad: Yes

History
- Founded: 26 December 2018; 7 years ago

Links
- Website: www.giaan115.com
- Lists: Hospitals in Vietnam

Gia An 115 Hospital (Bệnh viện Gia An 115) is a 367 bed private general hospital, owned by Hoa Lam Group, in Ho Chi Minh City. Gia An 115 Hospital is the second hospital in the Hoa Lam-Shangri-La Healthcare Techpark, next to City International Hospital, of Tên Lửa planned community. The location is in the South-West of Ho Chi Minh City, on the gateway to Mekong Delta. Inaugurated in December 2018, the hospital was known as the first Public–private partnership hospital in Ho Chi Minh City, thanks to the agreement between Hoa Lam Corporation and People 115 Hospital, approved by the Central Government and People Committee of the City.

Gia An 115 Hospital has 19 specialties in total, including emergency, anaesthesiology, cardiology, cardiothoracic surgery, dental & oral and maxillofacial surgery, ophthalmology, otorhinolaryngology, endocrinology, gastroenterology, general surgery, medical oncology, nuclear medicine, neurology, gynaecology, orthopedic surgery, physiotherapy, stroke, renal medicine, respiratory and urology .

== See also ==
- List of hospitals in Vietnam
- City International Hospital, a sister hospital
