= Huỳnh Thục Vy =

Vietnamese journalist (born 1985)

- Born: 20 November 1985 (age 40); Buôn Hồ, Đắk Lắk province, Vietnam
- Occupation: Journalist
- Years active: 2008–present
- Organization: Vietnamese Women for Human Rights
- Criminal charges: Defacing the flag of Vietnam
- Criminal penalty: 33 months imprisoned
- Criminal status: Released
- Spouse: Lê Khánh Duy
- Children: 2
- Father: Huỳnh Ngọc Tuấn

Huỳnh Thục Vy (born 20 November 1985) is a Vietnamese journalist and democracy activist. She served a custodial prison sentence on charges of defacing a flag between 2021 and 2024.

== Biography ==
Vy is the daughter of journalist and former prisoner of conscience Huỳnh Ngọc Tuấn; her brother, Huỳnh Trọng Hiếu, is also an activist. The family have experienced persecution from Vietnamese authorities; Tuấn served a ten-year prison sentence during Vy's childhood, and Hiếu as an adult sought asylum in Thailand and subsequently Canada. Vy is married to activist Lê Khánh Duy, with whom she has two children. She lives in Buôn Hồ, Đắk Lắk province.

Vy worked as an independent blogger and journalist, initially writing on political, social, environmental and human rights issues for the online portal Đàn Chim Việt in 2008. Vy advocated for young people to participate in Vietnamese politics, and called for the country to adopt a system with democracy and pluralism. In 2012, Vy was among five bloggers, including her father, who received the Hellman/Hammett Prize from Human Rights Watch for courage despite a "severe political crackdown".

In 2013, she was among nine women who founded Vietnamese Women for Human Rights, a non-governmental organisation that provided material and emotional support to women whose rights had been violated by Vietnamese authorities, and also campaigned for women's rights to be known and respected. Vy authored a book, Nhận định Sự thật Tự do và Nhân quyền, which detailed human rights abuses in Vietnam. In July 2020, Vietnamese Women for Human Rights were declared a "reactionary force" by the Indoctrination Committee of the Communist Party of Vietnam during a broadcast on National Defence Television. One of her co-founders was sentenced to nine years' imprisonment and was exiled to the United States.

== Arrest and imprisonment ==
In November 2018, Vy was sentenced to two years and nine months in prison on charges of defacing a Vietnamese flag, an offence under article 276 of Vietnam's penal code. Vy was the mother of a two-year-old child at the time and pregnant, and was ordered to begin serving her sentence under house arrest until her youngest child turned three. While under house arrest on 19 July 2020, Vy was assaulted by security staff when leaving her home to attend church.

On 1 December 2021, Vy's house arrest was revoked by a provincial court in Đắk Lắk, with it being reported that she had breached the terms of her suspended sentence by "taking actions that violate the law which causes dangers to society"; specific evidence of what constituted the breach was not provided. In February 2022, Vy was transferred to Gia Trung prison in Gia Lai province, around 200 kilometres from her home in Buôn Hồ.

In October 2022, it was reported by Vy's father Tuấn that she had been beaten and choked by officers at Gia Trung prison. He also alleged that Vy had previously been told that her monthly visitation rights would be revoked if she continued to speak out about poor prison conditions and bring attention to the rights of female prisoners, including those who had been denied calls with their friends and family. Vy filed an appeal with Gia Trung prison and the Department of Prison Government concerning her treatment. The Committee to Protect Journalists called on Vietnamese authorities to hold accountable officers responsible for assaulting her.

On 1 June 2024, Vy was released from prison after serving 30 months' imprisonment.
