= Bình Tân, Ho Chi Minh City =

Bình Tân Phường Bình Tân
- Ward
- Interactive map of Bình Tân
- Coordinates: 10°48′13″N 106°35′29″E
- Country: Vietnam
- Municipality: Ho Chi Minh City
- Established: June 16, 2025

Area
  - Total: 4.34 sq mi (11.25 km^{2})

Population (2024)
  - Total: 161,851
  - Density: 37,260/sq mi (14,390/km^{2})
- Time zone: UTC+07:00 (Indochina Time)
- Administrative code: 27442

Bình Tân (Vietnamese: Phường Bình Tân) is a ward of Ho Chi Minh City, Vietnam. It is one of the 168 new wards, communes and special zones of the city following the reorganization in 2025.

== History ==
On June 16, 2025, the National Assembly Standing Committee issued Resolution No. 1685/NQ-UBTVQH15 on the arrangement of commune-level administrative units of Ho Chi Minh City in 2025 (effective from June 16, 2025). Accordingly, the entire land area and population of Bình Hưng Hòa B ward and part of Bình Hưng Hòa A, Tân Tạo wards of the former Bình Tân district will be integrated into a new ward named Bình Tân (Clause 38, Article 1).
