= Hanoi International American Hospital =

American International Hospital
- Healthcare Corporation of America

Geography
- Location: 199 Nguyễn Hoàng, An Phú, Quận 2, Thành phố Hồ Chí Minh 70000, Hanoi, Vietnam
- Coordinates: 10.798188290949254°N 106.74935958263625°E

Organisation
- Type: General

History
- Constructed: 2007

Links
- Website: benhvienquoctehoaky.vn
- Lists: Hospitals in Vietnam

Hanoi International American Hospital (American Hospital in Vietnam) - is a hospital built in Vietnam. Construction began in 2007, though was never completed. The investment license was issued by the Ministry of Planning and Investment of Vietnam in 1997, although the project did not begin until 10 years later. Construction was never completed and the hospital stands abandoned.

== Planned services and facilities ==
The hospital was originally planned to offer services under many branches of medicine, such as: General Medical Care, Surgery, Emergency Medicine, Pediatrics, Dentistry, Chiropractic, Psychiatry, Neurology, Gynecology, Ophthalmology, Plastic Surgery, Nuclear Medicine, Nursing Services, Otorhinolaryngology, Acupuncture, Oncology, Cardiology, Pathology.

The hospital also would have contained various services, such as: Pharmacy, Radiology (X-Ray, MRI, CT), Telemedical Monitor, a Blood Bank, a Healthy Food Store, Full Laboratory Services, Satellite Clinics, and a Transplant unit.

Construction was never completed. As of January 2024, the hospital remains abandoned.
