= Huỳnh Ngọc Tuấn =

Vietnamese journalist (born 1963)

- Born: 1963 (age 61–62)
- Citizenship: Vietnam
- Occupation: Journalist
- Criminal charges: Sending and distributing abroad a number of works that criticised the government
- Criminal penalty: 10 years imprisonment
- Criminal status: Released
- Children: 2, including Huỳnh Thục Vy

Huỳnh Ngọc Tuấn (born 1963) is a Vietnamese independent journalist known for his posts on Facebook. Having served a ten-year prison sentence between 1992 and 2002 for criticising the Vietnamese government, in 2025 he was arrested and charged for propaganda against the state.

== Biography ==
Tuấn was an independent journalist and writer who regularly wrote articles and commentaries on Vietnamese politics, human rights, and international affairs; as of the 2010s, he primarily posted on social media platforms like Facebook. In 2015, he stated that he had "given up on anti-communism", later writing in 2025 that he had "gave up the struggle for democracy" and that he was now "just a political analyst".

In 1992, Tuấn was sentenced to ten years in prison for "sending and distributing abroad a number of works that criticised the government" by the People's Court of Quảng Nam Province in Da Nang. In 2011, Tuấn was fined 100 million VND by the People's Committee in Quảng Nam province for "transmitting and posting anti-state information". Tuấn and his family have received harassment from Vietnamese authorities, including being subjected to home raids, surveillance, the confiscation of their computers and documents, and being subjected to travel restrictions. In 2012, Tuấn received Human Right Watch's Hellmann/Hammett Award which recognised persecuted writers. In 2022, his daughter Huỳnh Thục Vy, also a journalist, was sentenced to two years and nine months in prison for defacing a Vietnamese flag.

On 7 October 2025, Tuấn was arrested at his home in Buôn Hồ, Đắk Lắk province by officers from the provincial police. He was subsequently charged under article 117 of the Vietnamese penal code of "propagandising against the state". While the specific evidence against him has not yet been identified, the newspaper Người Việt noted that shortly before his arrest, Tuấn had published an article in which he compared the difference between government policies in Singapore and Vietnam, concluding that Singapore had become an "economic powerhouse" despite its small size and lack of resources, while the larger and more resourceful Vietnam lagged behind.

Tuấn is being detained at Đắk Lắk Provincial Police Detention Centre. His daughter Vy raised concerns that his health needs, including severe diabetes, were not being met in custody. The Committee to Protect Journalists called on Vietnamese authorities to immediately and unconditionally release Tuấn and cease harassing people for expressing critical views online. The Vietnam Civil Rights Project stated that Tuấn had been exercising his rights to freedom of thought and expression as enshrined in article 19 of the Universal Declaration of Human Rights.
