= Nguyen Thanh Liem =

Vietnamese surgeon

Nguyen Thanh Liem is a Vietnamese surgeon. He was the recipient of the 2018 Nikkei Asia Prize in Science, Technology and Environment. He is the director of the Vinmec Research Institute of Stem Cell and Gene Technology.

== Career ==
Liem performed the first laparoscopic surgery on a child in Asia. He served as the director of the Vietnam National Children’s Hospital.

In 2018 he received the Nikkei Asia Prize in Science, Technology and Environment for his work in reducing Vietnam’s child mortality rate. As of 2018, he was the director of the Vinmec Research Institute of Stem Cell and Gene Technology. The following year, he became a laureate of the Asian Scientist 100 by the Asian Scientist.
