= City International Hospital =

International hospital in Vietnam

- Hoa Lâm
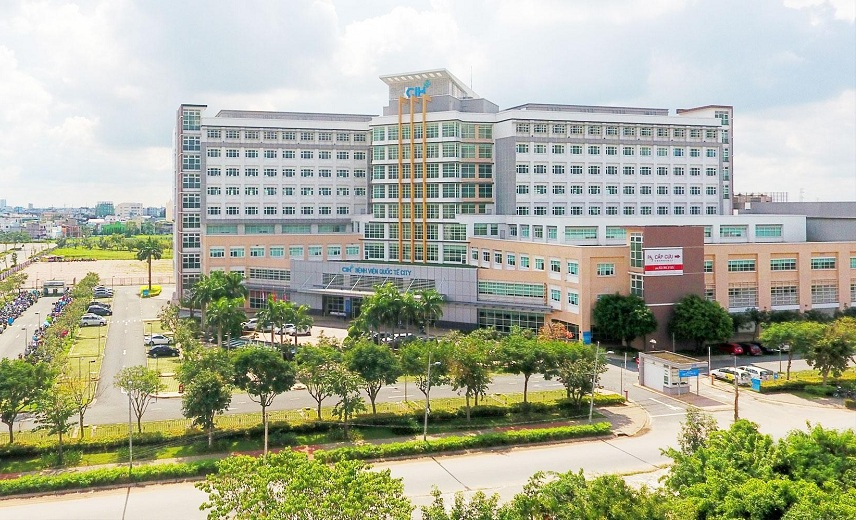

Geography
- Location: Shangri-La Hi-Tech Medical Park, No.3 Road 17A, An Lạc, Ho Chi Minh City

Organisation
- Care system: Private
- Type: Tertiary/quaternary
- Network: Cho Ray Hospital

Services
- Emergency department: Yes
- Beds: 320

Helipads
- Helipad: Yes

History
- Former name: Thành Đô International Hospital (2014)
- Founded: 5 January 2014; 12 years ago

Links
- Website: cih.com.vn/en/

City International Hospital (abbrev: CiH; Vietnamese: Bệnh viện Quốc tế City) is a care provider in Hoa Lâm Shangri-La Hi-Tech Medical Park of Tên Lửa planned community (originally named as An Lạc – Bình Trị Đông – Tân Tạo) in Bình Tân district, Ho Chi Minh City, Vietnam.

It was inaugurated originally in 2014 as Thành Đô International Hospital (Bệnh viện Quốc tế Thành Đô) and changed into the current name in the next year. It is one of six private hospitals licensed by the Vietnam Ministry of Health for medical examination and treatment for foreigners.

City International Hospital is recognized for its specialized medical services, particularly through its Centre of Excellence in Stroke care. The hospital also offers a range of services in general surgery, gastroenterology, obstetrics and gynecology, pediatrics, cardiology, and interventional radiology using digital subtraction angiography.

It has been included in the list of recommended international medical providers by the U.S. Embassy and Consulate in Vietnam..

The hospital has also been showcased by Hospital Management Asia, Government Insider, The ASEAN Post,, Voice of America and AmCham Healthcare Committee Whitebook. In addition, it has contributed to efforts to broaden access to medical services by partnering with Pharmacity to launch Vietnam’s first walk-in clinic brand, the Pharmacity–CIH Convenient Care Clinic.

In August 2021, London-based Aseana Properties signed an agreement to sell its interests in City International Hospital to its Vietnamese joint-venture partner, Hoa Lâm Corporation, for a gross sales price of approximately US$95 million. The transaction was completed on 28 February 2022.

== See also ==
- List of hospitals in Vietnam
- Gia An 115 Hospital
