= Bình Hưng Hòa =

Bình Hưng Hòa Phường Bình Hưng Hòa
- Ward
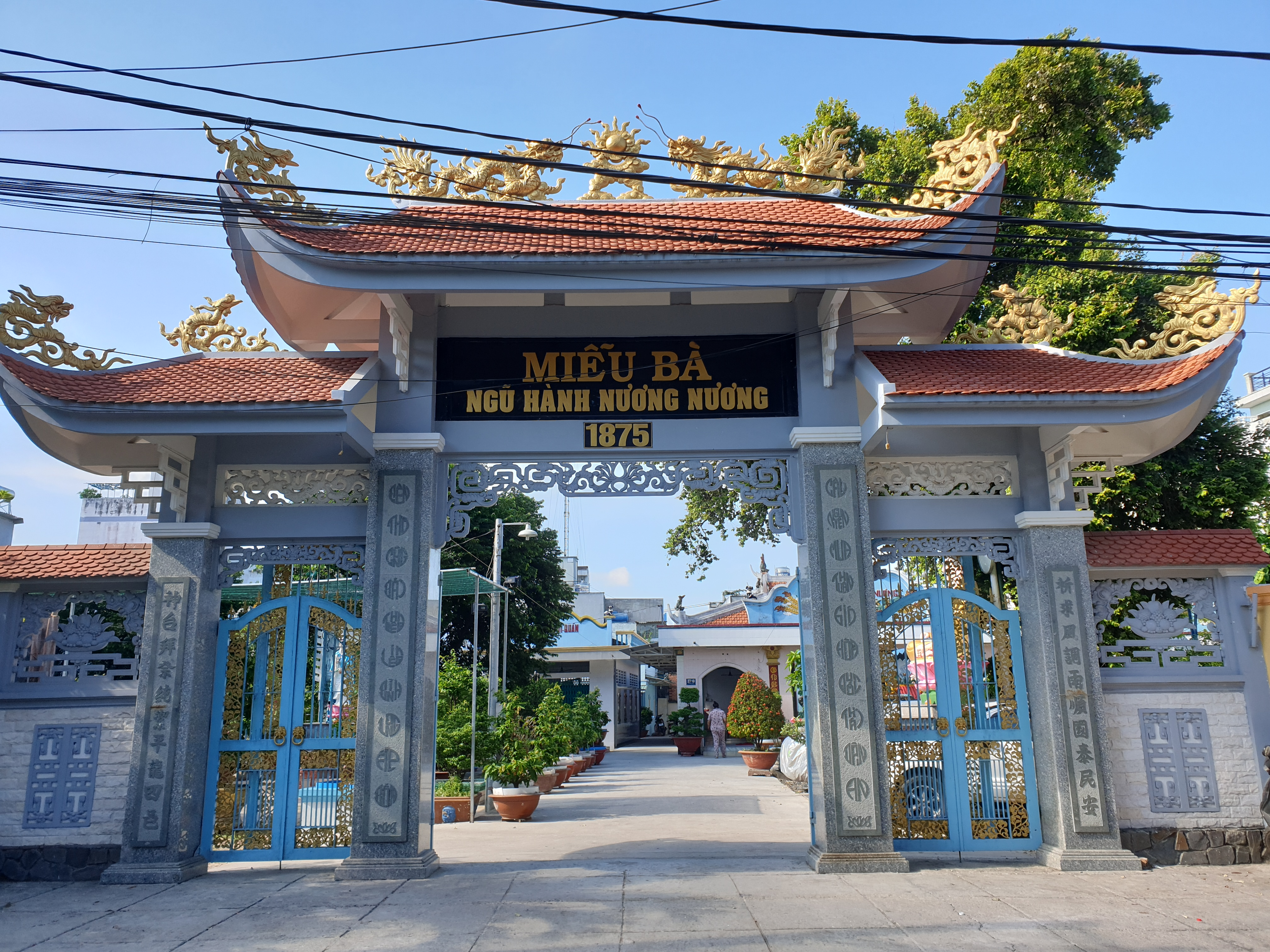
- Temple of Bà Ngũ Hành Nương Nương
- Interactive map of Bình Hưng Hòa
- Coordinates: 10°48′20″N 106°36′19″E
- Country: Vietnam
- Municipality: Ho Chi Minh City
- Established: June 16, 2025

Area
  - Total: 3.27 sq mi (8.47 km^{2})

Population (2024)
  - Total: 187,950
  - Density: 57,500/sq mi (22,200/km^{2})
- Time zone: UTC+07:00 (Indochina Time)
- Administrative code: 27439

Bình Hưng Hòa (Vietnamese: Phường Bình Hưng Hòa) is a ward of Ho Chi Minh City, Vietnam. It is one of the 168 new wards, communes and special zones of the city following the reorganization in 2025.

== History ==
On June 16, 2025, the National Assembly Standing Committee issued Resolution No. 1685/NQ-UBTVQH15 on the arrangement of commune-level administrative units of Ho Chi Minh City in 2025 (effective from June 16, 2025). Accordingly, the entire land area and population of Bình Hưng Hòa ward, part of Bình Hưng Hòa A ward of the former Bình Tân district and part of Sơn Kỳ ward of the former Tân Phú district will be integrated into a new ward named Bình Hưng Hòa (Clause 41, Article 1).
