= Vietnam National Hospital of Pediatrics =

Geography
- Location: Hanoi, Vietnam
- Coordinates: 21.024467°N 105.807154°E

Organisation
- Type: Specialist

Services
- Speciality: Pediatrics

History
- Former names: Institute for the Protection of Children's Health, Vietnam-Sweden Children’s Hospital, Olof Palme Pediatric Institute, and National Hospital of Pediatrics
- Opened: 1969

Links
- Website: www.nhp.org.vn
- Lists: Hospitals in Vietnam

Vietnam National Children's Hospital is a medical facility in Hanoi. Initially established in 1969 as Institute for the Protection of Children's Health. It was also known as Vietnam-Sweden Children’s Hospital, Olof Palme Pediatric Institute, and National Hospital of Pediatrics (NHP) before adopting its present name in 2016.

The facility was designated to follow the model of pediatric department in Bach Mai Hospital of Hanoi and became the leading pediatric center in all Vietnam.

The Hospital provide treatment in neurology, respiratory diseases, malnutrition, oncology, nephrology, endocrinology, hematology, cardiology, gastroenterology, surgery, neonatology, intensive care, emergency, infectious diseases, psychiatry, anaesthesiology, surgical recovery, traditional East Asian medicine, out-patient examination, physiotherapy rehabilitation.

Each year VNCH organize services for nearly 40,000 in-patients and 350,000 out-patients and performs about 30,000 surgical operations. It also regularly conducts scientific research and training in pediatrics field.

There is an active cooperation with international organizations and hospitals from other countries of the world, including Japan International Cooperation Agency, the Royal Children's Hospital of Melbourne, the TRAC (training and research collaboration Sweden-Vietnam, where Swedish universities work together with 3 Vietnamese partners), the Friendship Organization ICPH of Sweden, the American Veterans Association, REI association of the USA, Atlantic Philanthropies, Project Vietnam (based in United States), Dartmouth College, Samsung Medical center of Korea, Babino Gesú Hospital of Italia etc.

== See also ==
- Nguyen Thanh Liem (former director)
