= Bình Trị Đông =

Bình Trị Đông Phường Bình Trị Đông
- Ward
- Interactive map of Bình Trị Đông
- Coordinates: 10°45′58″N 106°36′55″E
- Country: Vietnam
- Municipality: Ho Chi Minh City
- Established: June 16, 2025

Area
  - Total: 2.76 sq mi (7.15 km^{2})

Population (2024)
  - Total: 165,142
  - Density: 59,800/sq mi (23,100/km^{2})
- Time zone: UTC+07:00 (Indochina Time)
- Administrative code: 27448

Bình Trị Đông (Vietnamese: Phường Bình Trị Đông) is a ward of Ho Chi Minh City, Vietnam. It is one of the 168 new wards, communes and special zones of the city following the reorganization in 2025.

== History ==
On June 16, 2025, the National Assembly Standing Committee issued Resolution No. 1685/NQ-UBTVQH15 on the arrangement of commune-level administrative units of Ho Chi Minh City in 2025 (effective from June 16, 2025). Accordingly, the entire land area and population of Bình Trị Đông ward and part of Bình Hưng Hòa A, Bình Trị Đông A wards of the former Bình Tân district will be integrated into a new ward named Bình Trị Đông (Clause 40, Article 1).
