= Vietnam-Sweden Hospital =

Vietnam-Sweden hospital

Geography
- Location: Uông Bí, Quảng Ninh, Vietnam
- Coordinates: 21°2′30″N 106°45′7″E

Organisation
- Type: General hospital

Services
- Standards: Level I
- Beds: 580

History
- Founded: 1981

Links
- Website: http://www.vsh.org.vn/

Vietnam–Sweden Hospital (Vietnamese: Bệnh viện Việt Nam-Thụy Điển) is the largest general hospital in Uông Bì, Quảng Ninh Province, Vietnam, founded in 1981 with the help of the Swedish.

At present, the hospital has 7 functional, 19 clinical and 8 subclinical departments. Vietnam–Sweden Hospital has 580 beds, employs 619 health workers including 140 medical doctors and pharmacists.

Each year Vietnam–Sweden hospital organize services for nearly 140,000 out-patients, 33,000 in-patients and performs about 9,500 major surgical operations.

== See also ==
- List of hospitals in Vietnam
