= Bạch Mai Hospital =

Bach Mai Hospital
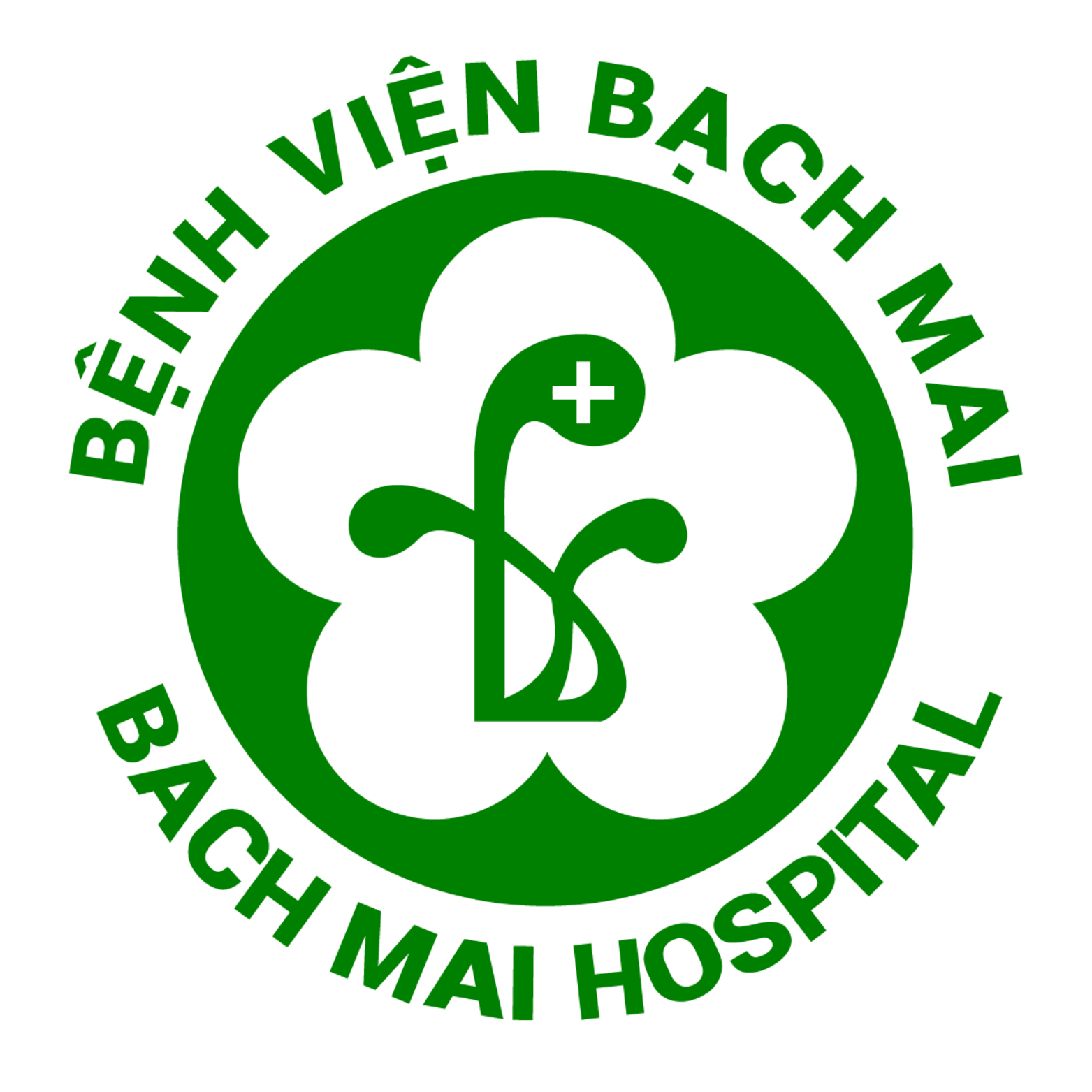

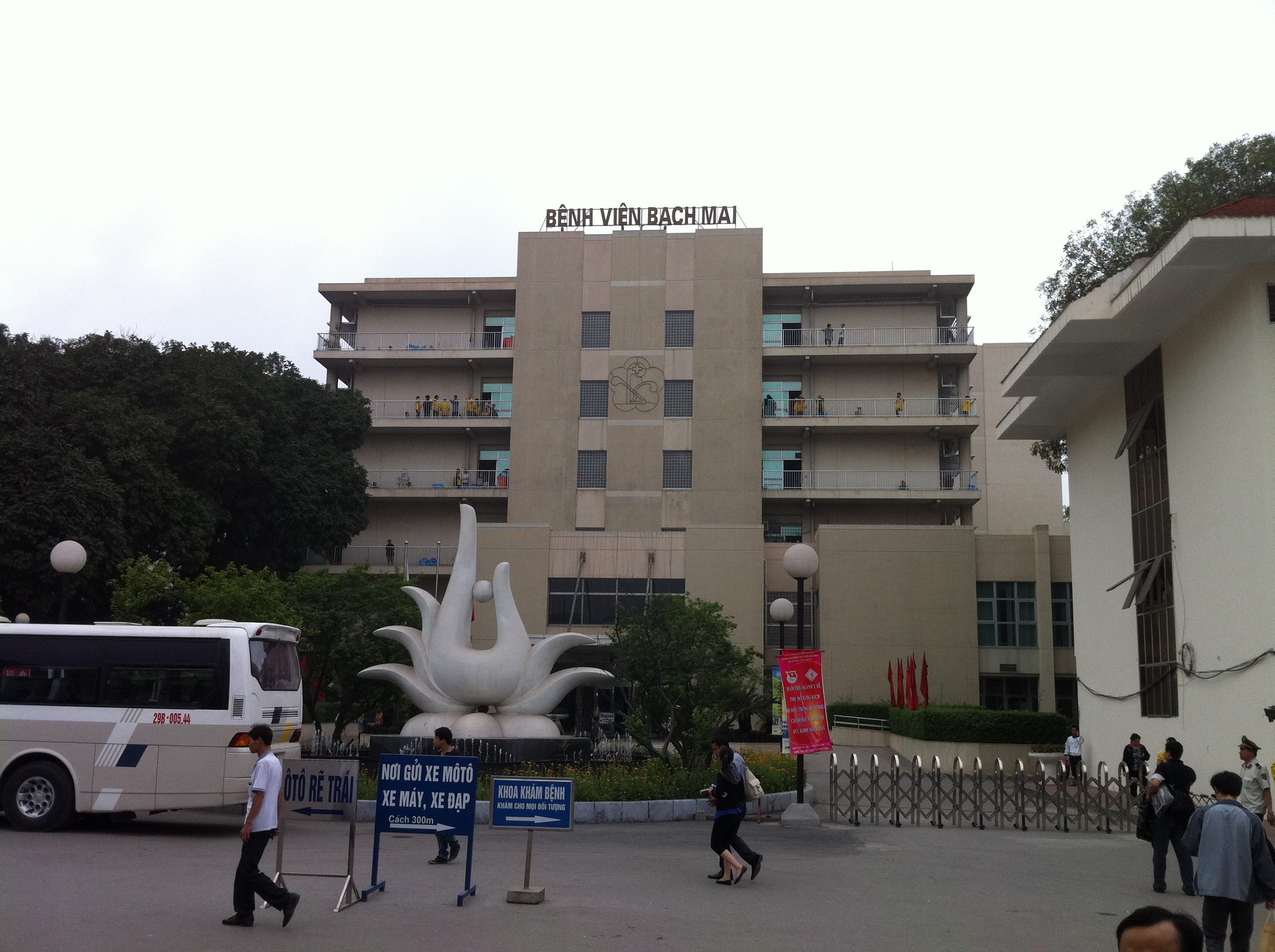
- Bach Mai Hospital's front gate

Geography
- Location: 78 Giai Phong Rd, Bạch Mai Ward, Hanoi, Vietnam
- Coordinates: 21.0010°N 105.8407°E

Organisation
- Care system: Public
- Type: General

Services
- Emergency department: Yes
- Beds: 3500

History
- Founded: 1911

Links
- Website: bachmai.gov.vn
- Lists: Hospitals in Vietnam

Bach Mai Hospital is a multi-field medical facility in Hanoi and is considered one of the largest in Vietnam. The hospital was established in 1911 during the French colonial rule. It has played an important role in the health system of Vietnam and is one of three high specialized medical centers, specializing in internal medicine. It is a big center of cadres training and scientific research in the country. The hospital has 3,500 beds and 4,300 staff.

During Nixon's Christmas bombing, Operation Linebacker II, on December 22, 1972, American bombs struck the hospital, obliterating the building and killing 28 hospital staff members and an unconfirmed number of patients.

A special rehabilitation unit was opened in 1998 for treating adults and children with disabling conditions (stroke and cerebral palsy). The unit sponsored by Veterans for America has seen more than 1,700 patients and has fitted more than 2,100 plastic braces since its establishment.

In 2000, Bach Mai Hospital was partly reconstructed and supplied with up-to-date facilities and equipment under a grant aid project of the Government of Japan.

When SARS broke out in Vietnam in 2003, Bach Mai Hospital substantially contributed to putting it under control by providing strict nosocomial infection control, which was implemented by Japanese experts.

There is a small speech therapy unit at the hospital, headed by Dr. Vu Thi Bich Hanh.

In May 2008, a spinal unit with 25 patient beds was established with the help of Handicap International.

== Vietnam War bombing ==
During Nixon's Christmas bombing, Operation Linebacker II, on 22 December 1972, over 100 American bombs struck the hospital, obliterating the building and killing 28 hospital staff members and a large number of patients, despite most taking refuge in the hospital's basement. Almost the entire hospital was destroyed, including the operating rooms. The U.S. military falsely claimed that the hospital "frequently housed anti-aircraft positions." According to the director of the hospital, Đỗ Doãn Đại, the U.S. bombing served to break the morale of hospital staff and Hanoians and was a gross violation of international law and a reprehensible war crime against the civilian population of Hanoi.

The hospital was subsequently rebuilt, largely with private donations from the United States. A bas-relief memorial to the victims can be seen in the courtyard today.

== COVID-19 pandemic ==
During the COVID-19 pandemic, the hospital served as an intensive care center for treating COVID-19 patients.

== See also ==
- List of hospitals in Vietnam
