= Saint Paul Hospital (Hanoi) =

- Archdiocese of Hanoi

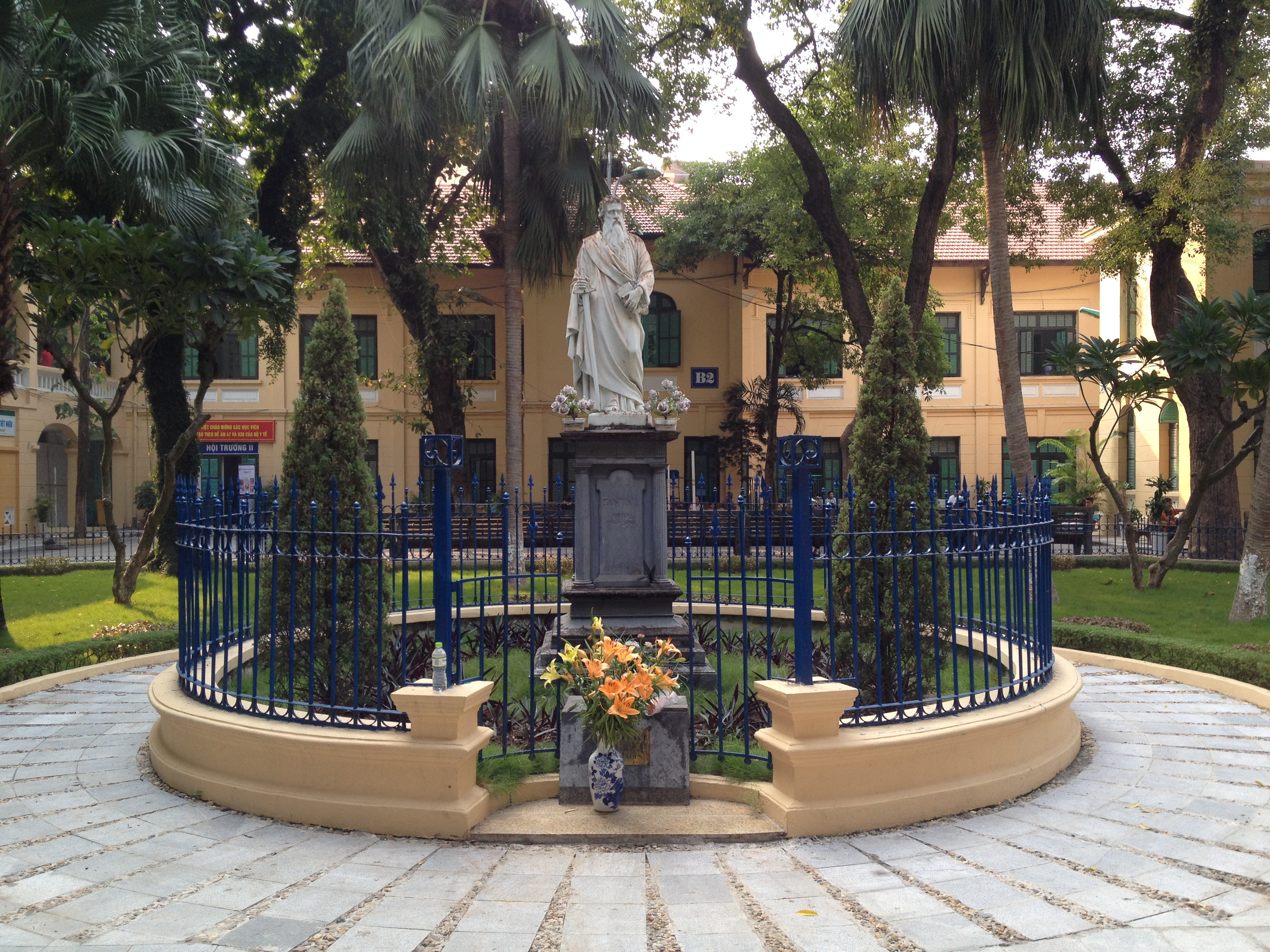
- Statue of Saint Paul in the grounds of Hospital

Geography
- Location: Ba Đình, Hanoi, Vietnam
- Coordinates: 21.031603°N 105.835127°E

Organisation
- Type: General
- Religious affiliation: Catholic church

History
- Opened: about 1902

Links
- Lists: Hospitals in Vietnam

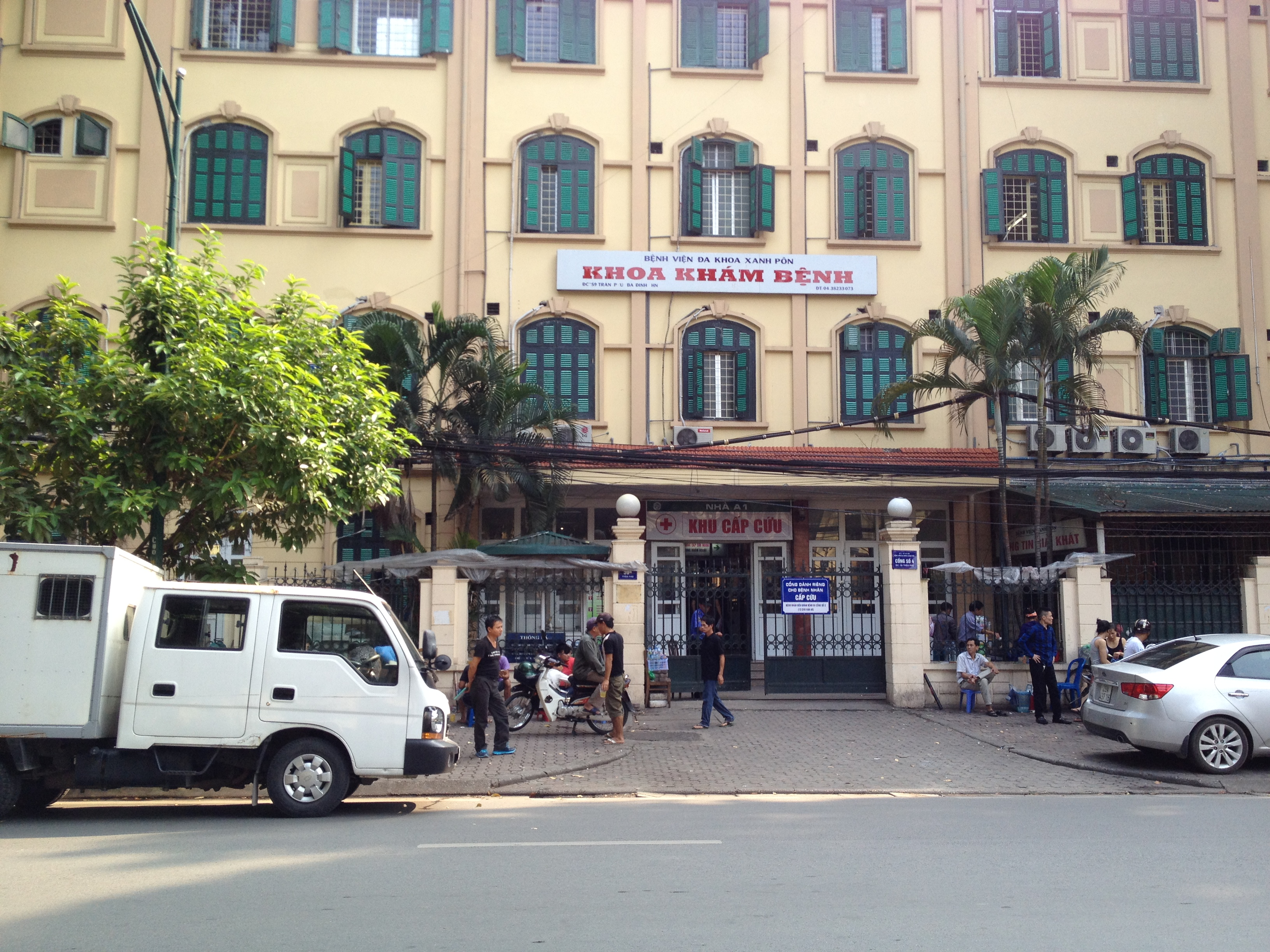
Department of medical examination and emergency

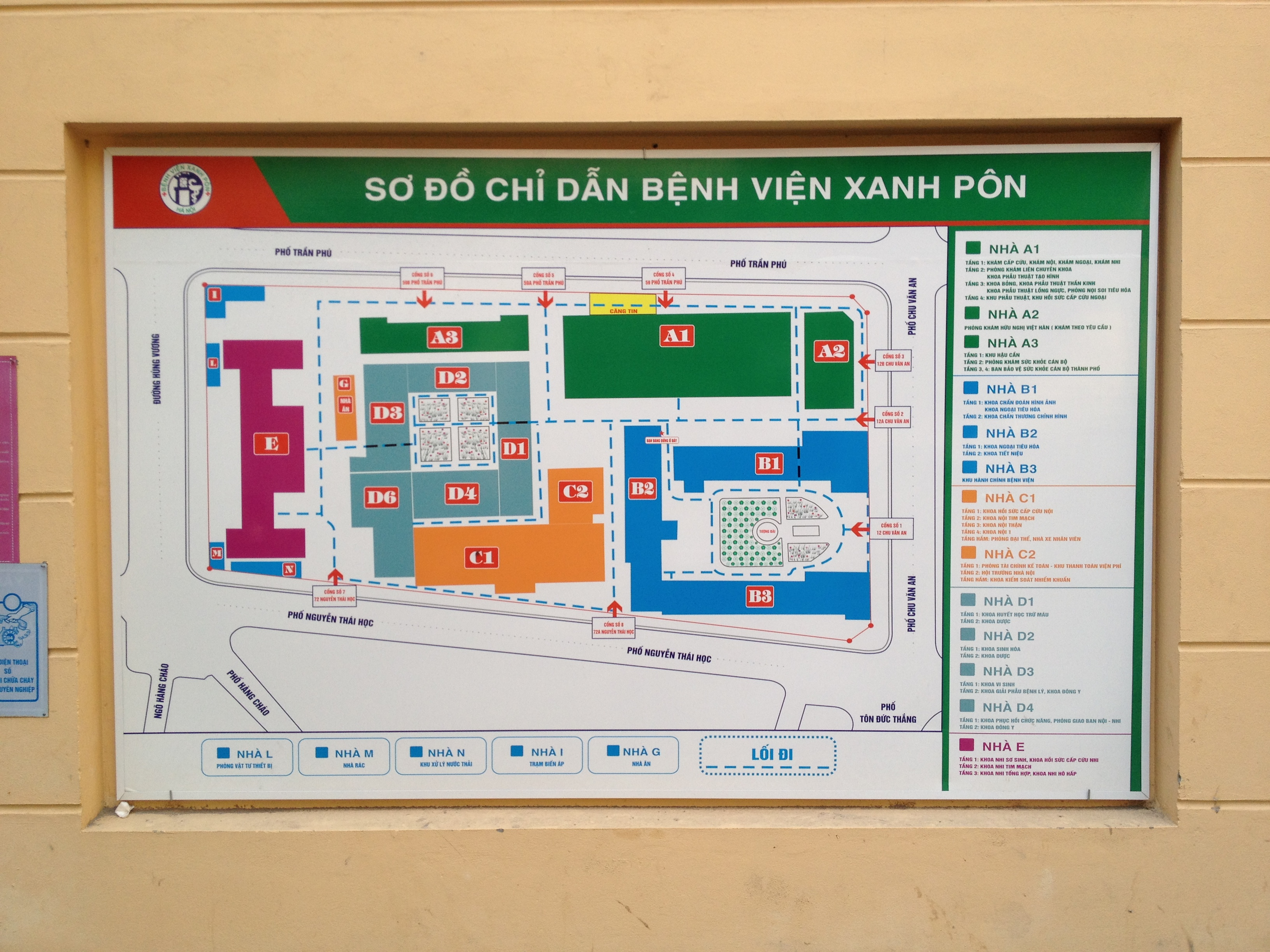
Maps of hospital buildings

The Saint Paul General Hospital is a large multi-field medical complex in the central district of Ba Đình, Hanoi, the capital of Vietnam. The hospital was founded in about 1902 during the French colonial rule in Indochina (19-th - early 20-th centuries). As the root of its name, it is used to be the largest Hôtel-Dieu in the Indochina, administered by the Archdiocese of Hanoi.

== History ==
The hospital is one of the main medical establishments in Hanoi for serving those, who suffered from traffic and other accidents, and people with external trauma. According to "The Project for Improvement of Capacity in Saint Paul Hospital" within the framework of grass-roots grant assistance of the Government of Japan, in 2007 the facility received US$84,954 for buying equipment for monitoring (1 piece), ventilator (2 pieces) and electrocardiography (1 piece), which are necessary for first-aid and critical trauma patients.

In 2001, it has been helped by the United States non-governmental organisations of Counterpart International, Project Hope, and World Medical Relief, in medicines and medical equipment worth US$302,457 for its emergency services. Norway, the United States, Japan and Netherlands in January, 2007 pledged to donate 7 million US dollars to establish a modern research centre at the hospital.

By declared plans of the Hanoi Health Department, Saint Paul Hospital will be upgraded to have a 6-storey building with 100 beds for the Therapeutics Ward and similar building with 150 beds for the Pediatrics Ward. The Hospital's second branch will have 500 beds after renovation.

== See also ==
- List of hospitals in Vietnam
