= Thomson Medical Centre =

- Thomson Medical Pte. Ltd

Geography
- Location: 339 Thomson Road, Singapore 307677
- Coordinates: 1°19′31.47″N 103°50′29.23″E

Organisation
- Funding: For-profit hospital
- Type: Specialist

Services
- Beds: 190
- Speciality: Obstetrics; Gynaecology; Paediatrics

History
- Opened: 1979; 47 years ago

Links
- Website: http://www.thomsonmedical.com

Thomson Medical Centre Limited (Abbreviation: TMC) is a 190-bed private hospital located at Thomson Road in Singapore. The hospital specialises in gynaecology and in vitro fertilisation (IVF). Thomson Medical Centre runs a 24-hour outpatient family clinic, as well as a range of specialist clinics.

== History ==
Thomson Medical Centre began operations in 1979.

=== In-vitro fertilisation (IVF) ===
Thomson Medical Centre is the first private hospital in Singapore to set up an In-vitro fertilisation clinic on its premises. In 1988, the hospital delivered Singapore's first IVF triplets. In the same year, the Thomson Fertility Clinic was set up. As of 2009, more than 5,000 couples have been treated for fertility and over 900 IVF babies have been born at their clinic.

In 1989, Thomson Medical Centre delivered Asia's first set of surviving IVF quadruplets, delivered by Cheng. The Tan quadruplets were born on Mother's Day and consist of three girls and a boy. Since 1990, fertility specialists have capped the number of implanted embryos at three, making the Tan quadruplets one of the last IVF quadruplets in Singapore.

In 1990, the hospital produced its first frozen embryo baby.

In 2000, they were the world's first fertility clinic to produce twins from frozen eggs and frozen sperm.

In 2010, an IVF mix-up produced a baby with a different father's sperm. Thomson Medical were fined the maximum S$20,000 for failing to ensure suitable assisted reproduction practices were followed, as well as being banned from new IVF for 8 months. After a long-running case, in March 2017 the mother of the child was awarded 30% of the costs of bringing up the child, with whom she does not share a 'genetic affinity'.

== Business Operations ==
Thomson Medical Centre was listed on the SGX-SESDAQ board in 2005, becoming the fourth healthcare services provider listed on SGX, after Parkway Holdings, Raffles Medical Group and Health Management International. Thomson Medical Centre however was acquired by investor Peter Lim and subsequently delisted on 24 January 2011.

== See also ==
- List of hospitals in Singapore
- Singapore
- International healthcare accreditation
- Medical tourism
