= Tân Tạo =

Tân Tạo Phường Tân Tạo Bà Hom
- Ward
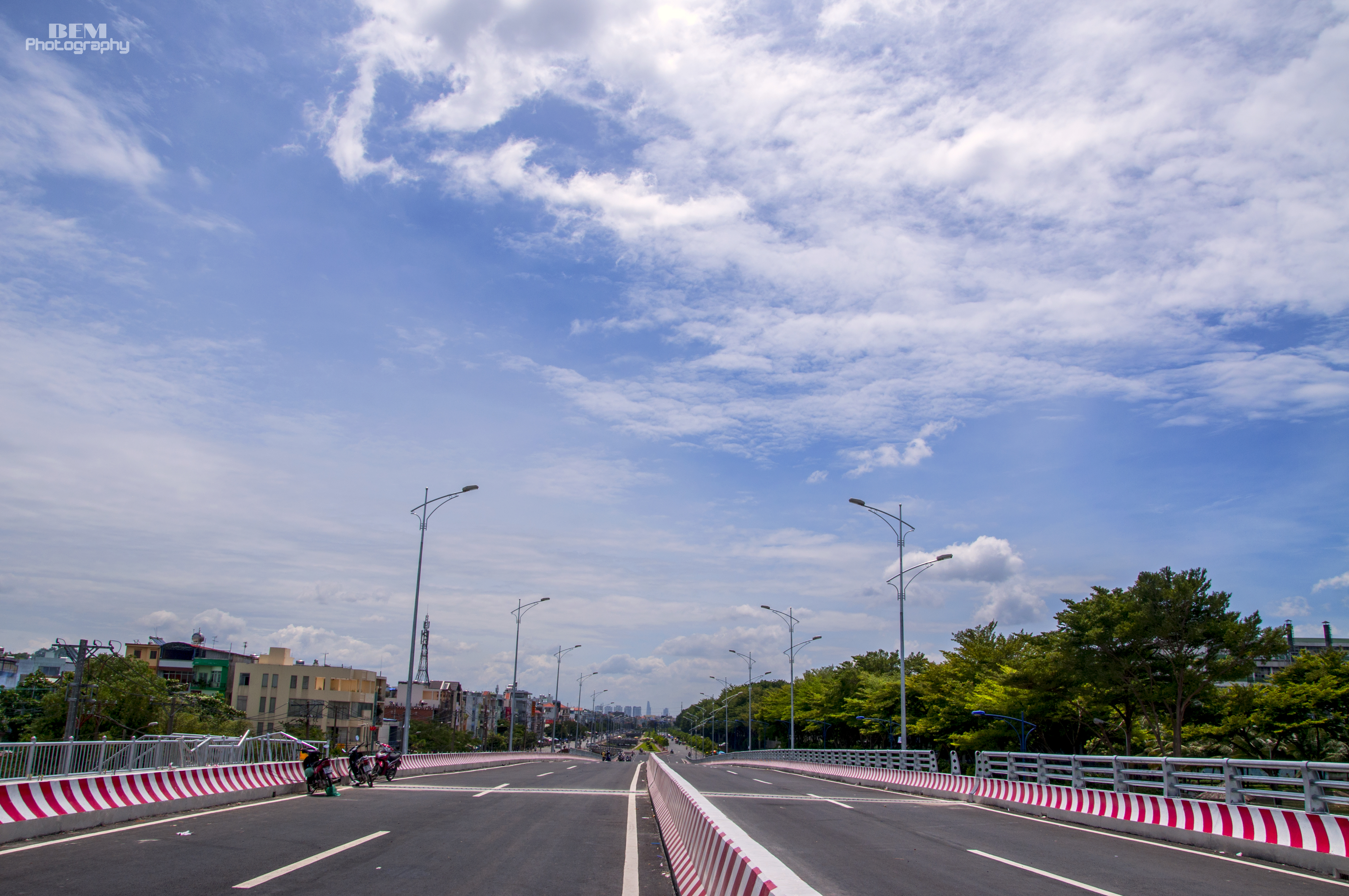
- Overpass on Provincial Road 10B
- Interactive map of Tân Tạo
- Coordinates: 10°45′00″N 106°35′35″E
- Country: Vietnam
- Municipality: Ho Chi Minh City
- Established: June 16, 2025

Area
  - Total: 5.68 sq mi (14.71 km^{2})

Population (2024)
  - Total: 113,363
  - Density: 19,960/sq mi (7,707/km^{2})
- Time zone: UTC+07:00 (Indochina Time)
- Administrative code: 27457

Tân Tạo (Vietnamese: Phường Tân Tạo) is a ward of Ho Chi Minh City, Vietnam. It is one of the 168 new wards, communes and special zones of the city following the reorganization in 2025.

== History ==
On June 16, 2025, the National Assembly Standing Committee issued Resolution No. 1685/NQ-UBTVQH15 on the arrangement of commune-level administrative units of Ho Chi Minh City in 2025 (effective from June 16, 2025). Accordingly, part of the land area and population of Tân Tạo, Tân Tạo A wards of the former Bình Tân district and part of Tân Kiên commune of the former Bình Chánh district will be integrated into a new ward named Tân Tạo (Clause 39, Article 1).
