= Tang thương ngẫu lục =

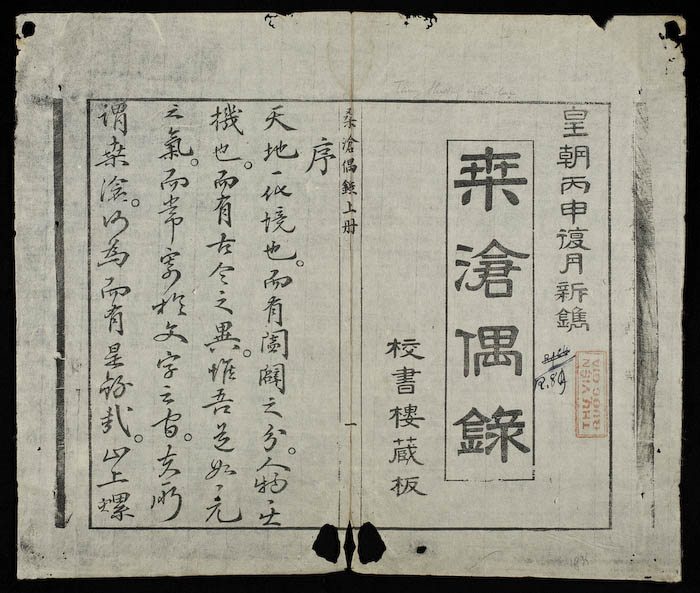
Tang thương ngẫu lục

The Tang thương ngẫu lục (chữ Hán: 桑滄偶錄, Random Record of Great Changes, 1806) is a Literary Chinese work by Vietnamese Confucian scholars Phạm Đình Hổ and Nguyễn Án. The work documents religious and social events of 18th-century Vietnam.
