= Buôn Hồ =

- Ward
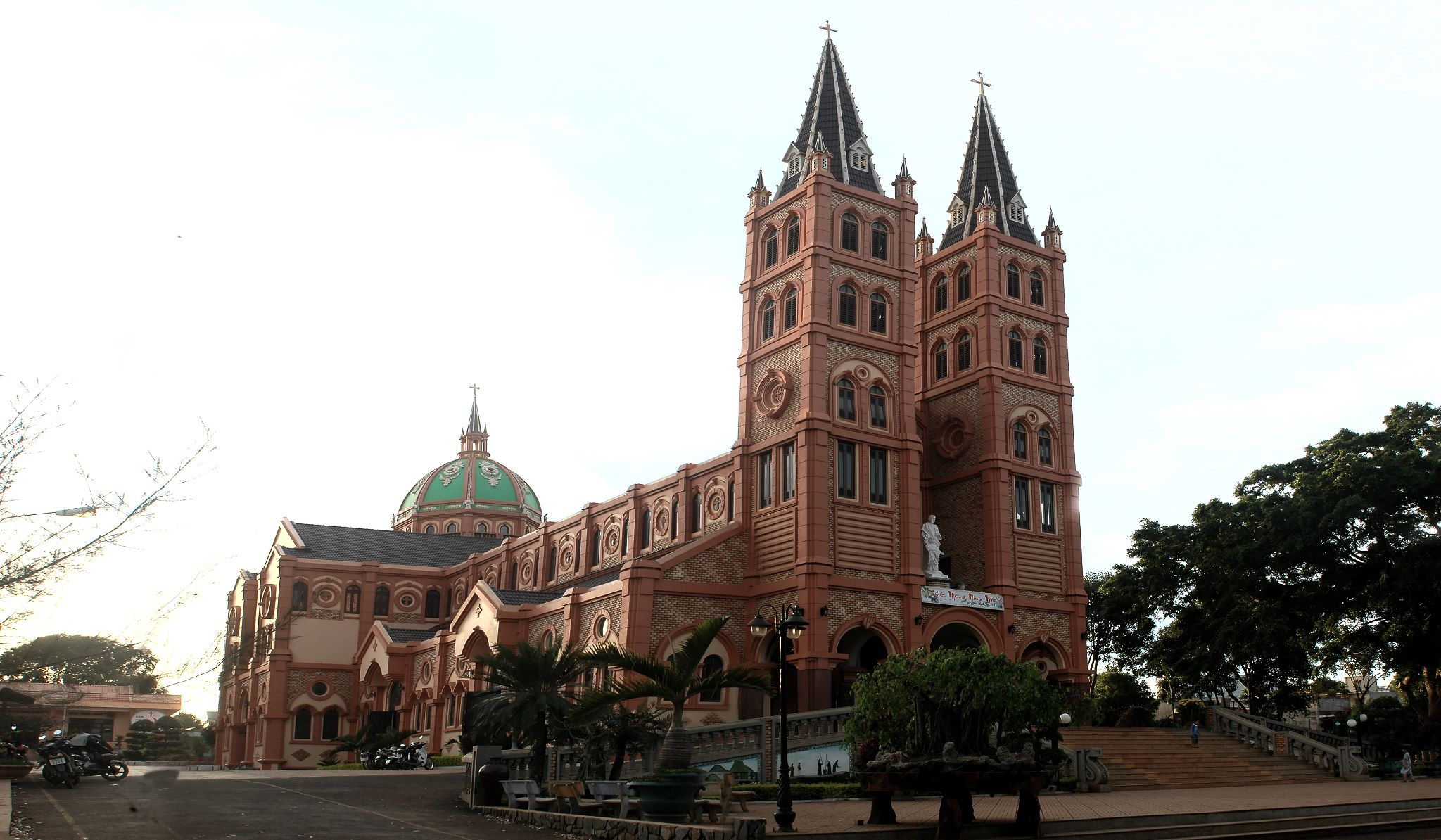
- Buôn Hồ Church
- Interactive map of Buôn Hồ
- Coordinates: 12.915752909099865°N 108.26707326674956°E
- Country: Vietnam
- Region: South Central Coast and Central Highlands
- Province: Đắk Lắk
- Established: 2025
- Administrative headquarters: 02 Trần Hưng Đạo Street

Area
  - Total: 66.54 km^{2} (25.69 sq mi)

Population (2025)
  - Total: 62,780
  - Density: 943/km^{2} (2,440/sq mi)
- Website: buonho.daklak.gov.vn

Buôn Hồ is a ward in Đắk Lắk province, Vietnam. The ward inherited its name from the former Buôn Hồ district-level town.

On 16 June 2025:

- The operation of district-level administrative units throughout Vietnam was terminated from 1 July 2025.
- The entire area and population of Đạt Hiếu, An Bình, An Lạc, Thiện An, Thống Nhất, and Đoàn Kết wards, formerly part of Buôn Hồ town, Đắk Lắk province, were merged to form a new ward named Buôn Hồ.
