= Bình Tân district, Ho Chi Minh City =

Binh Tan district Quận Bình Tân
- Urban district
- Seal

- Position in HCMC's core

- Location within Vietnam
- Coordinates: 10°46′06″N 106°35′56″E
- Country: Vietnam
- Centrally governed city: Ho Chi Minh City (Saigon)
- Established: 2003
- Wards: 10 phường

Government
  - People's Committee: Huỳnh Văn Chính

Area
  - Total: 52 km^{2} (20 sq mi)

Population (2022)
  - Total: 822,173
  - Density: 16,000/km^{2} (41,000/sq mi)

Demographics
- Time zone: UTC+07 (ICT)
- Website: binhtan.hochiminhcity.gov.vn

Bình Tân is a former urban district of Ho Chi Minh City (Saigon), Vietnam, and is known as a large inner city of migrant workers. In 2019 the district had a population of 784,173, in an area of 52 km^{2}. The name is a combination of Bình Hưng Hoà, Bình Trị Đông and Tân Tạo.

== Geographical location ==
Bình Tân district borders District 12 and Hóc Môn district to the north, District 8 and Bình Chánh district to the south, District 6, District 8 and Tân Phú district to the east, and Bình Chánh district to the west.

== Administration ==
Bình Tân district consists of ten wards:

- Bình Hưng Hòa
- Bình Hưng Hòa A
- Bình Hưng Hòa B
- Bình Trị Đông
- Bình Trị Đông A
- Bình Trị Đông B
- Tân Tạo
- Tân Tạo A
- An Lạc
- An Lạc A

== Healthcare ==
Located in Binh Tan district, Hoa Lam-Shangri-La Healthcare Techpark is the first healthcare park in Ho Chi Minh City and Vietnam with 1,700 bed capacity. There are two commissioned hospitals, including City International Hospital and Gia An 115 Hospital serving a population of 700 thousands in the region, from primary care to tertiary care.
