= List of schools in Ho Chi Minh City =

This is a list of schools in Ho Chi Minh City.

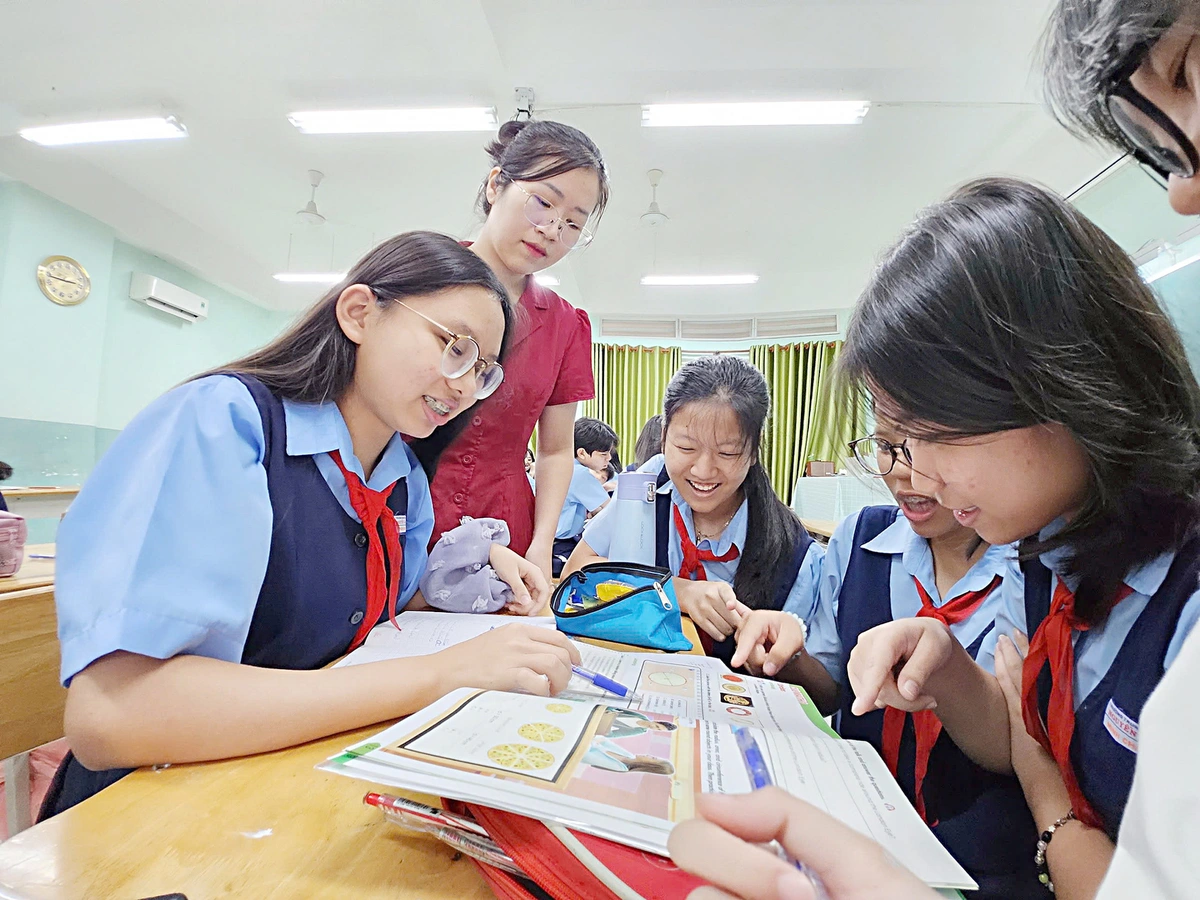
Schoolgirl at the School in HCMC

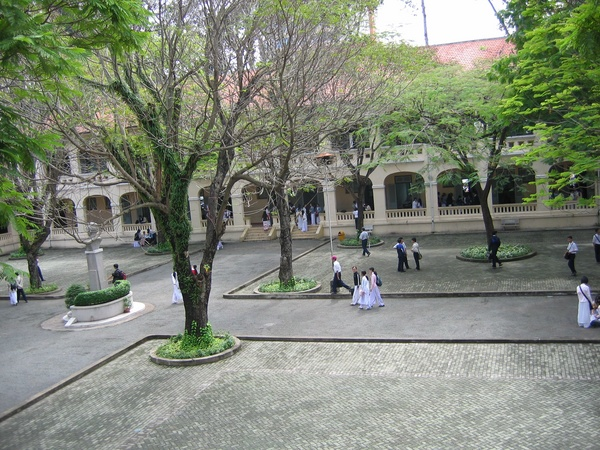
Le Hong Phong Specialized High School, Ho Chi Minh City

== Public schools ==
=== Public high schools (limited list) ===
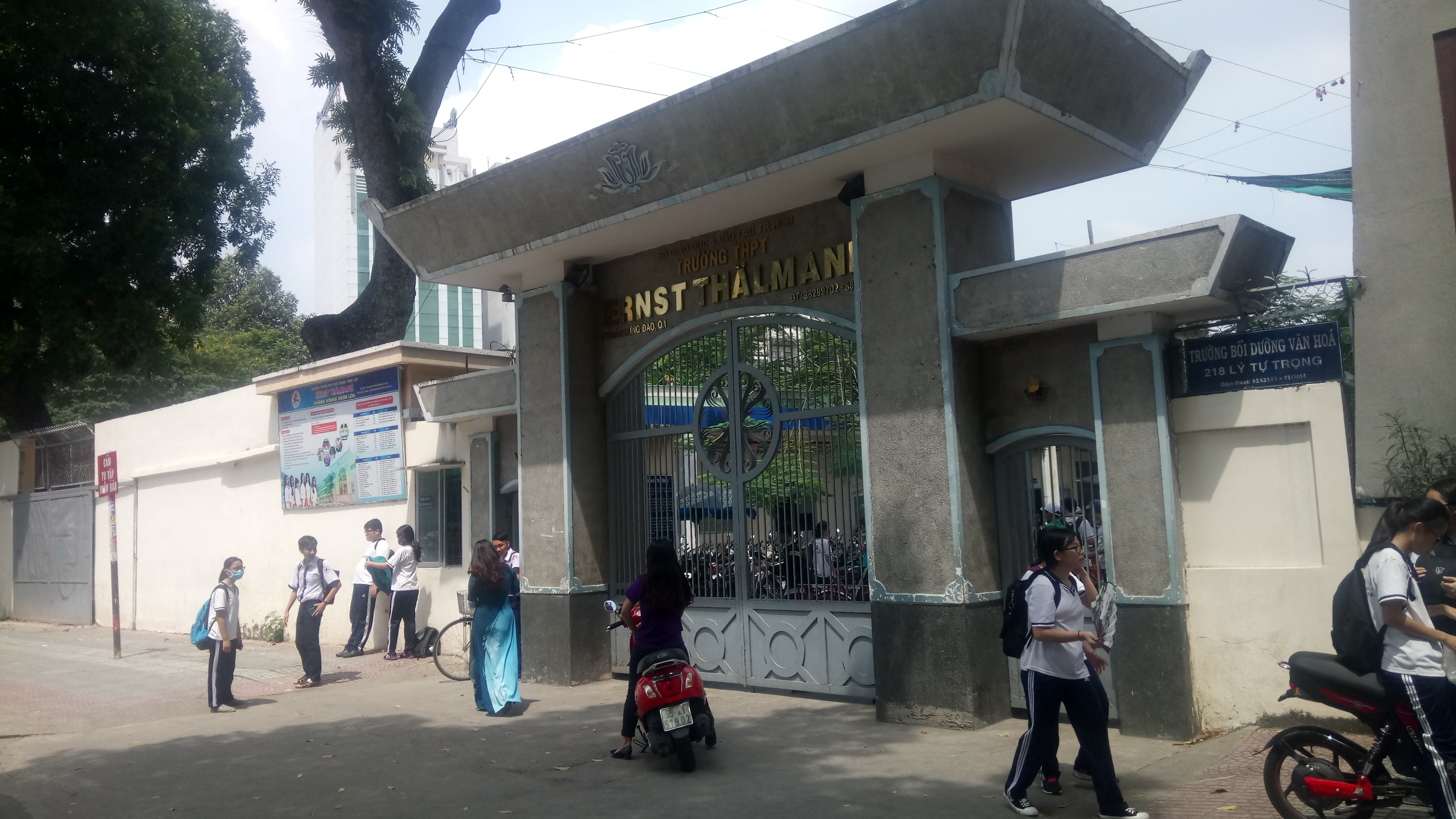
Trường THPT Ernst Thälmann (Ernst Thälmann High School) in District 1, Ho Chi Minh City

Ward/Commune	High school	Website
Hiệp Bình Ward	Hiệp Bình High School	
Tam Bình Ward	Tam Phú High School	
Tam Bình Ward	Bình Chiểu High School	
Thủ Đức Ward	Thủ Đức High School	
Thủ Đức Ward	Nguyễn Hữu Huân High School	
Linh Xuân Ward	Đào Sơn Tây High School	
Linh Xuân Ward	Linh Trung High School	
Long Bình Ward	Nguyễn Huệ High School	
Long Bình Ward	Nguyễn Văn Tăng High School	
Tăng Nhơn Phú Ward	Dương Văn Thì High School	
Phước Long Ward	Phước Long High School	
Long Phước Ward	-	
Long Trường Ward	Long Trường High School	
An Khánh Ward	-	
Bình Trưng Ward	Thủ Thiêm High School	
Bình Trưng Ward	Giồng Ông Tố High School	
Cát Lái Ward	-	
Tân Định Ward	-	
Bến Thành Ward	Bùi Thị Xuân High School	
Bến Thành Ward	Ten Lơ Man High School	
Sài Gòn Ward	Trưng Vương High School	
Cầu Ông Lãnh Ward	Lương Thế Vinh High School	
Bàn Cờ Ward	-	
Xuân Hòa Ward	Nguyễn Thị Minh Khai High School	
Xuân Hòa Ward	Marie Curie High School	
Xuân Hòa Ward	Nguyễn Thị Diệu High School	
Nhiêu Lộc Ward	-	
Vĩnh Hội Ward	-	
Khánh Hội Ward	-	
Xóm Chiếu Ward	Nguyễn Trãi High School	
Xóm Chiếu Ward	Nguyễn Hữu Thọ High School	
Chợ Quán Ward	-	
An Đông Ward	-	
Chợ Lớn Ward	Trần Hữu Trang High School	
Bình Tiên Ward	Phạm Phú Thứ High School	
Bình Tây Ward	Phan Bội Châu Secondary and High School	
Bình Phú Ward	Nguyễn Tất Thành High School	
Phú Lâm Ward	Mạc Đĩnh Chi High School	
Tân Mỹ Ward	Nam Sài Gòn High School	
Tân Hưng Ward	Tân Phong High School	
Tân Hưng Ward	Lê Thánh Tôn High School	
Tân Thuận Ward	-	
Phú Thuận Ward	-	
Chánh Hưng Ward	Lương Văn Can High School	
Bình Đông Ward	Nguyễn Văn Linh High School	
Bình Đông Ward	Tạ Quang Bửu High School	
Phú Định Ward	Ngô Gia Tự High School	
Phú Định Ward	Võ Văn Kiệt High School	
Vườn Lài Ward	Nguyễn An Ninh High School	
Vườn Lài Ward	Sương Nguyệt Anh Secondary & High School	
Diên Hồng Ward	Diên Hồng High School	
Hòa Hưng Ward	Nguyễn Khuyến High School	
Hòa Hưng Ward	Nguyễn Du High School	
Hòa Bình Ward	Trần Quang Khải High School	
Phú Thọ Ward	-	
Bình Thới Ward	Nguyễn Hiền High School	
Minh Phụng Ward	Nam Kỳ Khởi Nghĩa High School	
Đông Hưng Thuận Ward	Trường Chinh High School	
Trung Mỹ Tây Ward	-	
Tân Thới Hiệp Ward	Võ Trường Toản High School	
Thới An Ward	-	
An Phú Đông Ward	-	
Gia Định Ward	Hoàng Hoa Thám High School	
Gia Định Ward	Võ Thị Sáu High School	
Bình Thạnh Ward	-	
Bình Lợi Trung Ward	Trần Văn Giàu High School	
Bình Lợi Trung Ward	Phan Đăng Lưu High School	
Thạnh Mỹ Tây Ward	Gia Định High School	
Bình Quới Ward	-	
Bình Tân Ward	Vĩnh Lộc High School	
Bình Tân Ward	Bình Tân High School	
Bình Hưng Hòa Ward	Bình Hưng Hòa High School	
Bình Trị Đông Ward	Nguyễn Hữu Cảnh High School	
An Lạc Ward	An Lạc High School	
An Lạc Ward	Hoàng Thế Thiện High School	
Tân Tạo Ward	-	
Hạnh Thông Ward	Gò Vấp High School	
An Nhơn Ward	Trần Hưng Đạo High School	
Gò Vấp Ward	-	
Thông Tây Hội Ward	Nguyễn Công Trứ High School	
An Hội Tây Ward	-	
An Hội Đông Ward	Nguyễn Trung Trực High School	
Đức Nhuận Ward	Phú Nhuận High School	
Cầu Kiệu Ward	-	
Phú Nhuận Ward	Hàn Thuyên High School	
Tân Sơn Hòa Ward	-	
Tân Sơn Nhất Ward	Nguyễn Thượng Hiền High School	
Tân Hòa Ward	Nguyễn Thái Bình High School	

- VNUHCM High School for the Gifted
- Lê Hồng Phong High School for the Gifted
- Trần Đại Nghĩa High School for the Gifted
- Nguyễn Thượng Hiền High School
- Nguyễn Thị Minh Khai High School
- Bùi Thị Xuân High School
- Phú Nhuận High School
- Bình Phú High School
- Gia Định High School
- Mạc Đĩnh Chi High School
- Lê Quý Đôn High School
- Nguyễn Du Secondary School
- Nguyễn Hữu Cầu High School
- Nguyễn Hữu Huân High School
- Marie Curie High School
- Võ Thị Sáu High School
- Võ Trường Toản High School
- Hùng Vương High School
- Chu Văn An High School
- Trưng Vương High School
- Lương Thế Vinh High School
- Trần Khai Nguyên High School
- Ten Lơ Man High School
- Nguyễn Trãi High School
- Nguyễn Khuyến High School
- Nguyễn Du High School
- Nguyễn Công Trứ High School
- TRần Hưng Đạo High School
- Nguyễn Chí Thanh High School
- Nguyễn Thái Bình High School
- Thủ Đức High School
- Nguyễn Thị Diệu High School
- Ernst Thalmann High School (Trường THPT Ernst Thalmann)
- Lawrence S. Ting Memorial School

== Private schools ==
=== Private primary and secondary schools offering exclusively foreign curricula (non-exhaustive) ===
- ABC International School
- American International School, Saigon
- British International School Ho Chi Minh City
- British Vietnamese International School
- International School Ho Chi Minh City
- International School Ho Chi Minh City - American Academy
- Saigon South International School
- European International School Ho Chi Minh City
- Canadian International School Vietnam
- International German School Ho Chi Minh City
- Korean International School, HCMC
- Lycée Français International Marguerite Duras
- Saigon South International School
- Taipei School in Ho Chi Minh City
- Renaissance International School Saigon
- Vietnam Finland International School
- International School of North America

=== Private high schools offering Vietnamese or dual foreign-Vietnamese curricula (non-exhaustive) ===
- Pennsylvania American International School
- Western Australian International School System
- APU International School
- Japanese International School
- Wellspring International Bilingual School Ho Chi Minh City
- Singapore International School
- Horizon International Bilingual School (HIBS)
- Vinschool
- EMASI International Bilingual School
- VStar School
- Ngô Thời Nhiệm High School
- Nguyễn Khuyến High School
- Khai Trí High School
- Quang Trung Nguyễn Huệ High School
- Trí Đức High School
- Trương Vĩnh Ký High School
- Vinschool
- Hồng Hà Secondary-High School
- Tuệ Đức Pathway School

=== Private elementary-junior schools (non-exhaustive) ===
- Japanese School in Ho Chi Minh City
- Saint Ange French International School
- Saigon Star International School Ho Chi Minh City
- La Petite Ecole
- Aurora International School of the Arts
- EtonHouse E-Maison International Pre-School Ho Chi Minh City
- International School Saigon Pearl
- Montessori International School of Vietnam
- Lavele Academy

== See also ==
- List of universities in Ho Chi Minh City
