= Dragon House (Ho Chi Minh City) =

Historic house museum in District 4, Ho Chi Minh City

Coordinates: 10.7682°N 106.7068°E

Dragon House Hồ Chí Minh Museum, Ho Chi Minh City Branch
- Bến Nhà Rồng; Bảo Tàng Hồ Chí Minh, Chi nhánh Thành phố Hồ Chí Minh
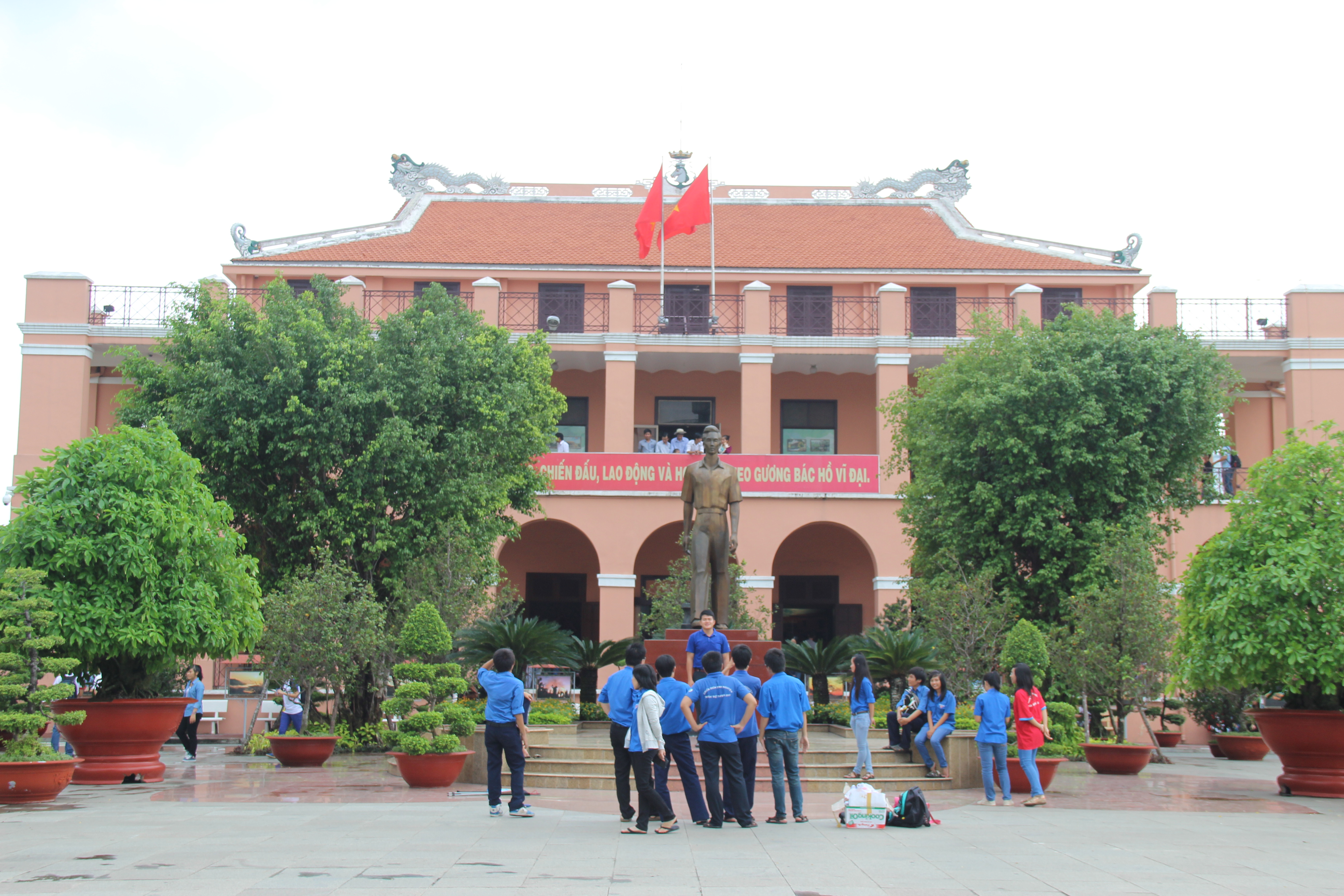
- The Dragon House building and the statue of younger Hồ Chí Minh (then Nguyễn Tất Thành)
- Former names: Marine Patrol Department (Sở Canh tuần tàu biển); "Senior Colonel" Department (Sở Ông Năm)
- Alternative names: Dragon House Wharf; Dragon House Harbor

General information
- Type: Historic house museum
- Location: Sài Gòn – Khánh Hội Port area, No.1 Nguyễn Tất Thành Street, Xóm Chiếu, District 4, Ho Chi Minh City
- Construction started: March 4, 1863; 163 years ago
- Inaugurated: 1864

Design and construction
- Known for: Where Uncle Ho left the country to find a way to save the nation

Dragon House (Vietnamese: Bến Nhà Rồng) or Dragon House Wharf, Dragon House Harbour, officially known as Ho Chi Minh Museum, Ho Chi Minh City Branch, was the original commercial port of Saigon. The construction began in 1862 and more than a year later, in 1863, the house was completed. It is located at the estuary of Bến Nghé Channel flow into Saigon River in District 4, Ho Chi Minh City.

On 5 June 1911, Ho Chi Minh (at the time named Nguyen Tat Thanh) departed from the Dragon House on the French ship Amiral de Latouche-Tréville for a 30-year journey around the world. Therefore, in 1979, the old headquarters building of the commercial port has been rebuilt into a museum in Ho Chi Minh City.

During the Vietnam War the building was used by the United States Military Sea Transportation Service.
