= Khánh Hội =

Khánh Hội may refer to several places in Vietnam:

- Khánh Hội, Ho Chi Minh City: a ward in the former District 4
- Khánh Hội, Ninh Bình: a commune in the former Yên Khánh district
