= Mong Bridge =

Steel bridge across the Ben Nghe Channel in Ho Chi Minh City

Coordinates: 10.768°N 106.7037°E

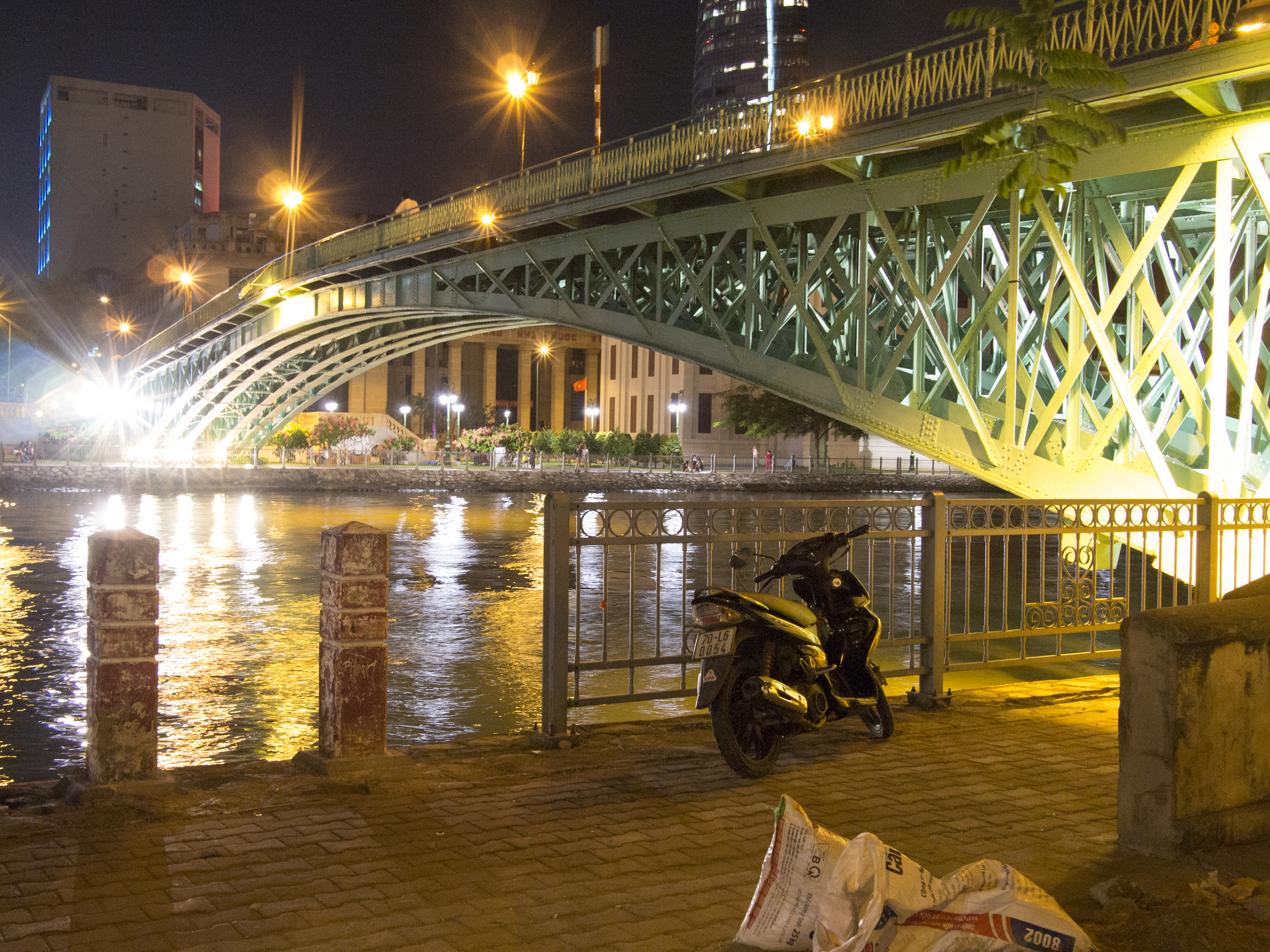

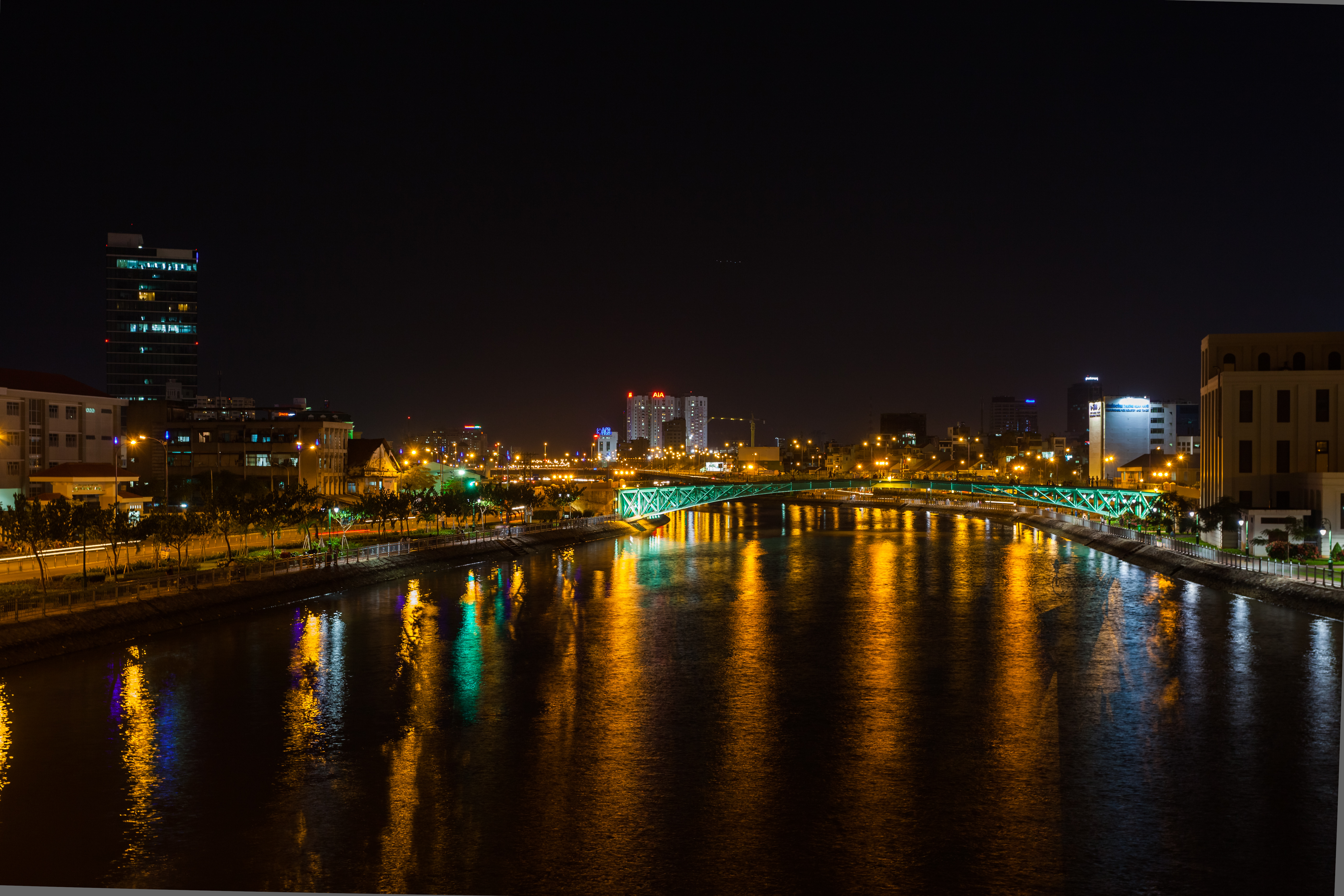
View from the Bến Nghé Channel

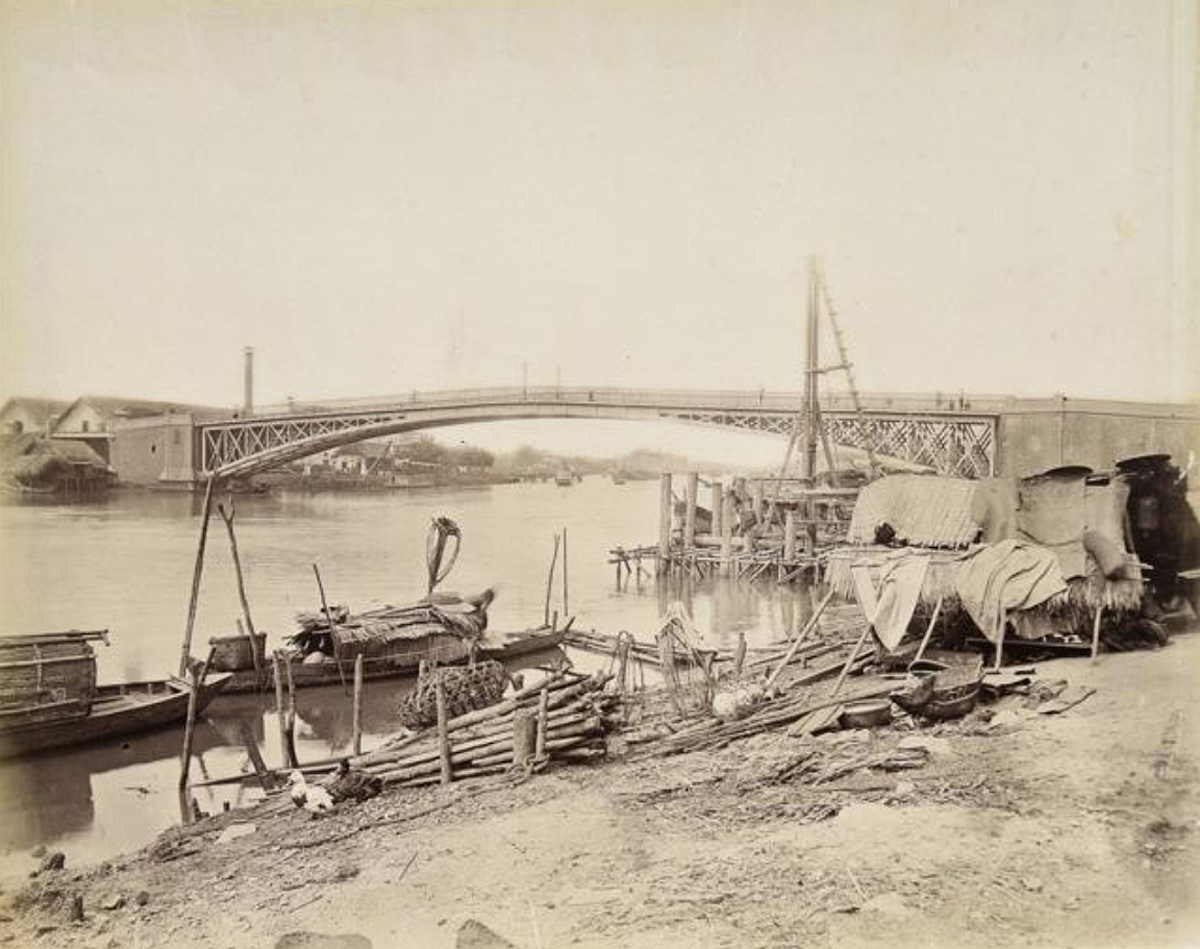
Pont des Messageries maritimes (1890-1900)

The Mong Bridge (Cầu Mống in Vietnamese, "Rainbow bridge") is a steel bridge across the Bến Nghé Channel, connecting District 1 and District 4 of Ho Chi Minh City. It is one of the oldest bridges in that city. Originally named Pont des Messageries maritimes, it was built in 1882 by Gustave Eiffel for the merchant shipping company Messageries maritimes, replacing a ferry route. The bridge was completely removed in 2005 during the construction of the Saigon River Tunnel and afterwards rebuilt, turning it from a road bridge into a footbridge. In addition, the previous statue of An Duong Vuong holding a magic crossbow was also dismantled.
