= Vĩnh Hội =

Vĩnh Hội Phường Vĩnh Hội
- Ward
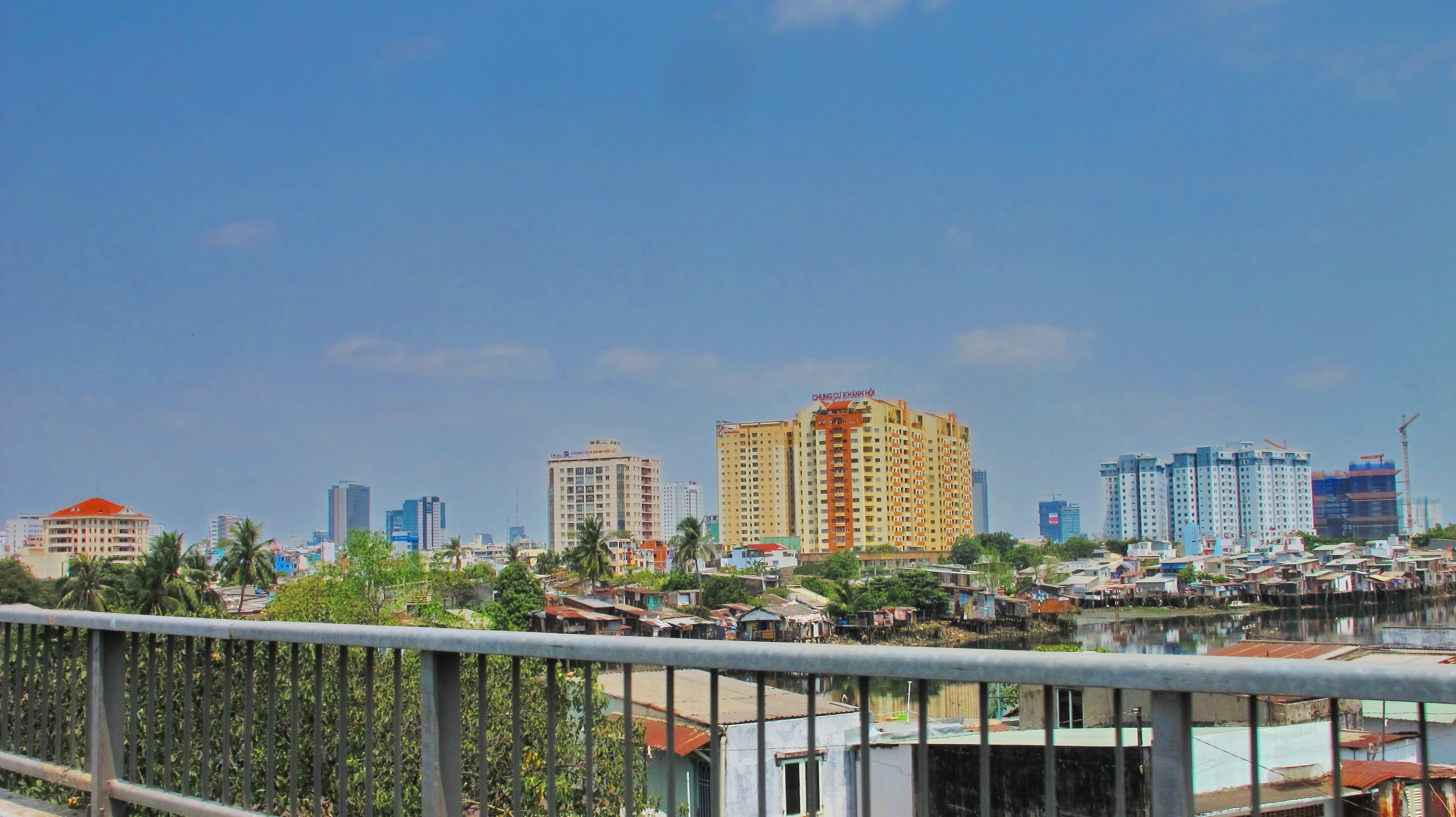
- Nguyễn Văn Cừ bridge as seen in Vĩnh Hội
- Interactive map of Vĩnh Hội
- Coordinates: 10°45′16″N 106°41′27″E
- Country: Vietnam
- Municipality: Ho Chi Minh City
- Established: June 16, 2025

Area
  - Total: 0.45 sq mi (1.17 km^{2})

Population (2024)
  - Total: 63,015
  - Density: 139,000/sq mi (53,900/km^{2})
- Time zone: UTC+07:00 (Indochina Time)
- Administrative code: 27286

Vĩnh Hội (Vietnamese: Phường Vĩnh Hội) is a ward of Ho Chi Minh City, Vietnam. It is one of the 168 new wards, communes and special zones of the city following the reorganization in 2025.

== Geography ==
Vĩnh Hội is located in the center of Ho Chi Minh City, it borders the following wards:

- To the south, it borders Tân Hưng and Chánh Hưng, with the Kênh Tẻ Canal being the border
- To the west, it borders Chợ Quán, with the Bến Nghé Channel being the boundary.
- To the north, it borders Cầu Ông Lãnh, with the Bến Nghé Channel being the boundary.
- To the east, it borders Khánh Hội.

According to Official Dispatch No. 2896/BNV-CQĐP dated May 27, 2025 of the Ministry of Home Affairs, following the merger, Vĩnh Hội has a land area of 1.17 km², the population as of December 31, 2024 is 63,015 people, the population density is 53,858 people/km².

== History ==
On June 16, 2025, the Standing Committee of the National Assembly issued Resolution No. 1685/NQ-UBTVQH15 on the rearrangement of commune-level administrative units of Ho Chi Minh City in 2025. Accordingly, the entire land area and population of Ward 1 and Ward 3, and the remaining parts of Ward 2 and Ward 4 after rearrangement as prescribed in Clause 9, Article 1 of the former District 4 will be integrated into a new ward named Vĩnh Hội (Clause 10, Article 1).
