= Bến Nghé Channel =

Waterway in Ho Chi Minh City, Vietnam

Bến Nghé Canal Bình Dương River, Arroyo Chinois
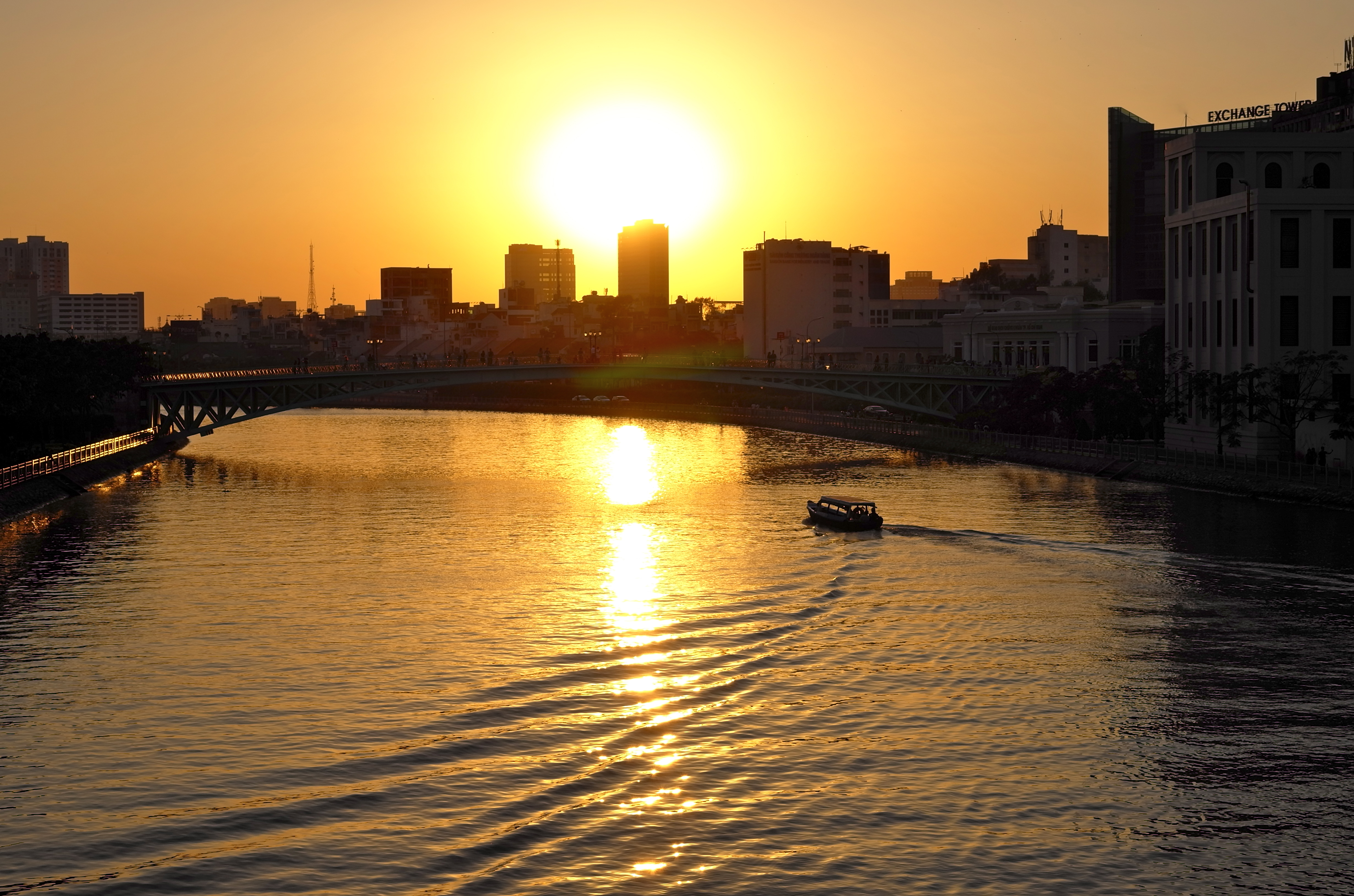
- Bến Nghé Canal in sunset from Khánh Hội Bridge
- Native name: Vietnamese: Rạch Bến Nghé, Kênh Bến Nghé

Location
- Country: Vietnam
- Districts (formerly): District 1 - District 4
- Wards: Cầu Ông Lãnh, Bến Thành, Saigon - Vĩnh Hội, Khánh Hội, Xóm Chiếu

Physical characteristics
- Mouth: Saigon River
  - coordinates: 10°46′09″N 106°42′24″E

Basin features
- River system: Saigon River
- Bridges: Khánh Hội Bridge, Mống Bridge, Calmette Bridge, Ông Lãnh Bridge, Nguyễn Văn Cừ Bridge
- Navigability: Saigon River - Tàu Hủ Channel - Tẻ Channel - Đôi Channel

Bến Nghé Channel (Vietnamese: Rạch Bến Nghé) is a waterway in Ho Chi Minh City. Very much an urban channel, the sides are said to be lined with "many grocery stores, rice processing factories, sawmills, oriental drugstores, and warehouses, all owned by the Chinese. They hatch[ed] eggs, salted fish and eggs, dried fruit ..."

In Gia Định thành thông chí, the current-day Bến Nghé Canal was called as Bình Dương River (sông Bình Dương). Until the French Indochina, Bến Nghé Canal and Tàu Hủ Channel are generally called as Arroyo Chinois. From the early 2000s, the Tàu Hủ - Bến Nghé waterway is included in programs for relocating residents along canals and waterways, improving water environment and drainage, and urban beautification.

== Location ==
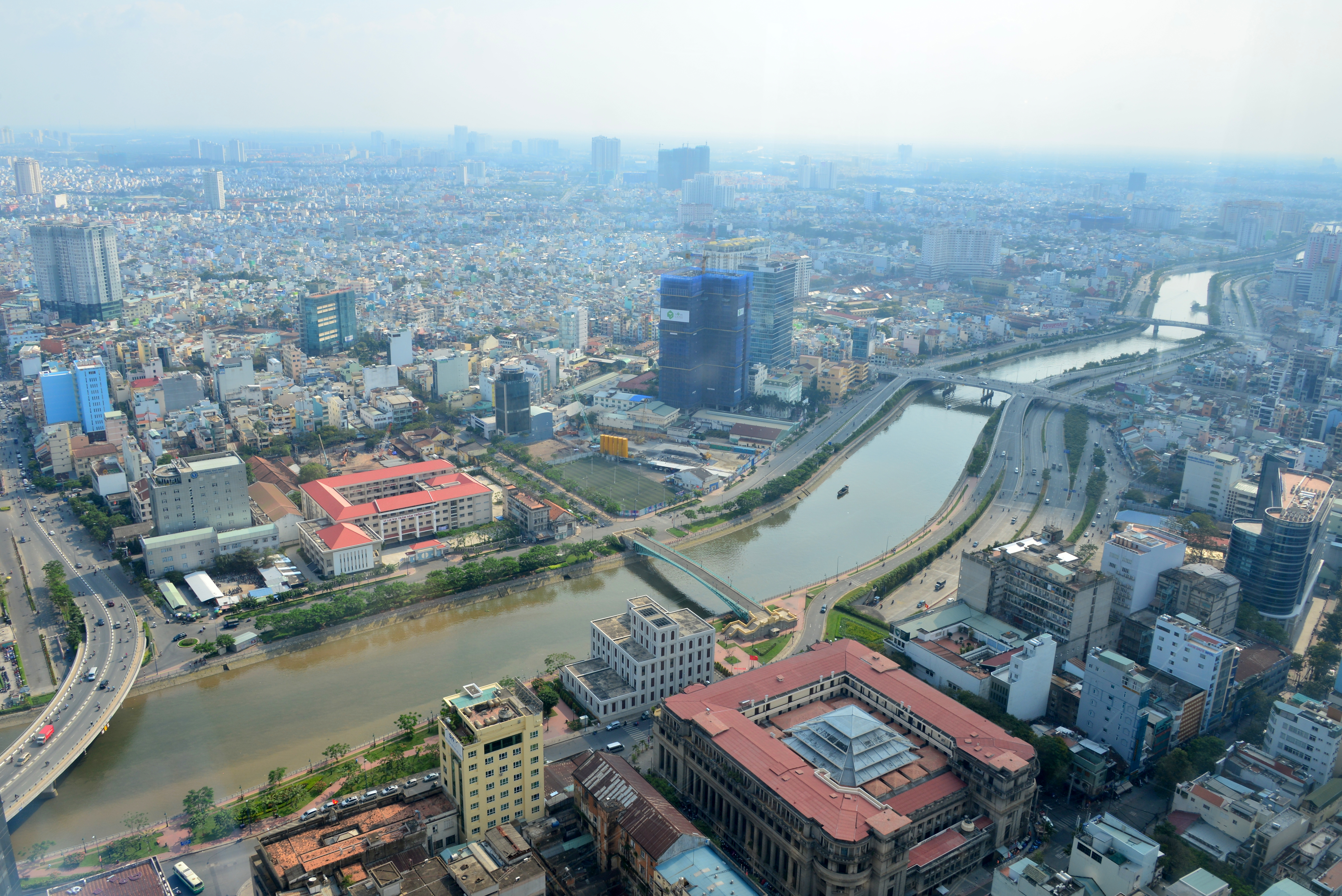
Bến Nghé Canal seen from the Bitexco Financial Tower

In the Tàu Hủ - Bến Nghé system, Bến Nghé Canal is the section starts at the area between Bạch Đằng Quay and Dragon House Wharf, where the canal meet the Saigon River, then flows toward the southwest to the point where it meets the channels of Tàu Hủ, Tẻ and Đôi; the next section is Tàu Hủ Channel, extending from Bến Nghé Canal to the intersection of Rạch Cát River. In the Ho Chi Minh City local inland waterway route catalog for the period 2024-2026, the Bến Nghé canal route is listed from Tàu Hủ channel to Saigon river, with a length of 3.22 km, a planned technical level of V, and an current exploitation status that "does not yet meet level VI".

Within the inner-city canal system, the Tàu Hủ - Bến Nghé canal route is classified as one of the five main canal routes in the program for relocating and resettling people living on and along canals and waterways during the 2001-2005 period. This route is 8.965 km long and has two tributaries are Hàng Bàng (Chợ Lớn) và Cầu Dừa (Vĩnh Hội). The program defines the inner-city river and canal network according to four functions: drainage, waterway transportation, connecting the provinces of the Mekong Delta with the Southeast region, and creating urban landscapes.

== Roads ==
The East–West Highway runs along the canal (included the Tàu Hủ Channel), from Lò Gốm Bridge to Bạch Đằng Quay.
