= Cầu Ông Lãnh =

Cầu Ông Lãnh Phường Cầu Ông Lãnh Cầu Muối, Cầu Kho, Nhơn Hòa, Tân Hòa
- Ward
- Cầu Ông Lãnh from above, with notable Pullman Saigon Centre Hotel and Hotel Nikko Saigon
- Interactive map of Cầu Ông Lãnh
- Coordinates: 10°45′46″N 106°41′28″E
- Country: Vietnam
- Municipality: Ho Chi Minh City
- Established: June 16, 2025

Area
  - Total: 0.62 sq mi (1.60 km^{2})

Population (2024)
  - Total: 78,734
  - Density: 127,000/sq mi (49,200/km^{2})
- Time zone: UTC+07:00 (Indochina Time)
- Administrative code: 26758

Cầu Ông Lãnh (Vietnamese: Phường Cầu Ông Lãnh) is a ward of Ho Chi Minh City, Vietnam. It is one of the 168 new wards, communes and special zones of the city following the reorganization in 2025.

== Etymology ==
The name of the ward is derived from the fact that the quarter surrounding Ông Lãnh Bridge, and the bridge was believed to named after rank of a Lãnh binh (military commander) who built it, or after a Lãnh sự (consul) who had a house nearby (the first theory is considered more plausible). It was a bustling commercial area, with Cầu Ông Lãnh market and some major markets nearby, e.g. Cầu Muối, Cháy Market and Market of Chicken-Rice (Chợ Gà-Chợ Gạo), next to the same name bridge, which was once the largest wholesale market in the city until the new wholesale markets were built in the suburb of Ho Chi Minh City like Bình Điền in the west (Bình Đông), Thủ Đức in the northeast (Tam Bình) and Hóc Môn in the northwest (Xuân Thới Sơn).

The Nguyễn Thái Học Boulevard run across the ward was known as Rue de Kitchener in the French Indochina period as slaughterhouse were located on the both side of this thoroughfare.

== Geography ==
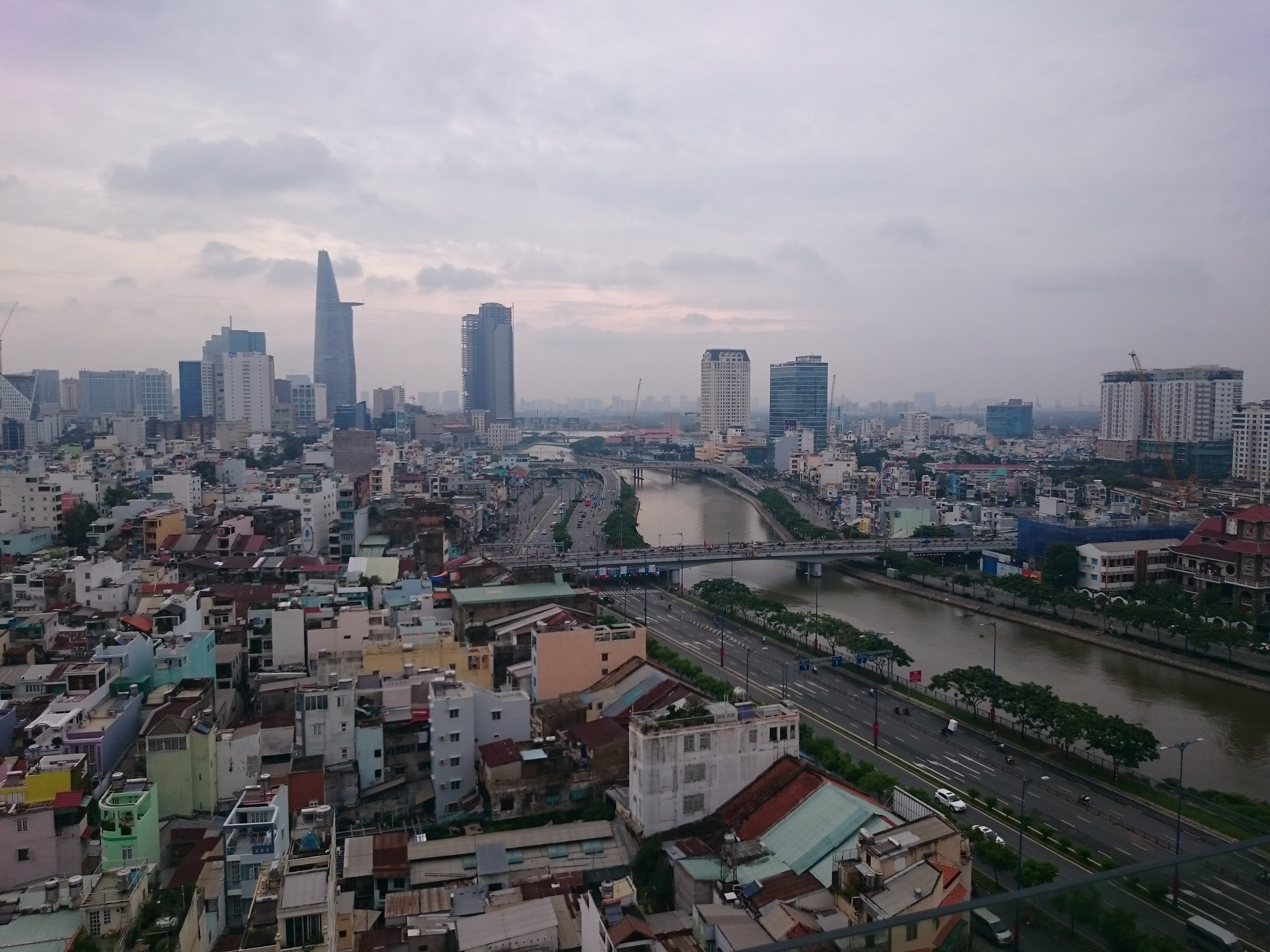
Cầu Ông Lãnh view towards Saigon

Cầu Ông Lãnh lies next to the center of Ho Chi Minh City, it is bordered by the following wards:

- Bàn Cờ to the north by Nguyễn Thị Minh Khai Street
- Chợ Quán to the west by Nguyễn Văn Cừ Boulevard
- Khánh Hội and Vĩnh Hội to the south by the Bến Nghé Channel
- Bến Thành to the east and northeast by Nguyễn Thái Học Boulevard, Trần Hưng Đạo Boulevard and streets of Nguyễn Cư Trinh - Cống Quỳnh

According to Official Dispatch No. 2896/BNV-CQĐP dated May 27, 2025 of the Ministry of Home Affairs, following the merger, Cầu Ông Lãnh has a land area of 1.60 km², the population as of December 31, 2024 is 78,734 people, the population density is 49,208 people/km².

== History ==
During South Vietnam's rule over the ward, Cầu Ông Lãnh was a part of District 2.

In 1962 a part of Cầu Ông Lãnh was ceded to Bùi Viện ward

In 1976, District 2 was merged into District 1, Cầu Ông Lãnh was dissolved and divided into 4 wards: Ward 18, Ward 19, Ward 20 and Ward 21 of District 1.

On December 28, 1988, the Council of Ministers issued Decision 184-HDBT, it renamed Ward 20 into Cầu Ông Lãnh.

On June 16, 2025, the Standing Committee of the National Assembly issued Resolution No. 1685/NQ-UBTVQH15 on the arrangement of commune-level administrative units of Ho Chi Minh City in 2025 (effective from June 16, 2025). Accordingly, the eastern part of Cầu Ông Lãnh on Nguyễn Thái Học Boulevard was merged into the new Bến Thành ward, while the entire area and population of Nguyễn Cư Trinh, Cầu Kho, Cô Giang and the western part of Cầu Ông Lãnh after being arranged according to the provisions of Clause 3, Article 1 will be arranged into a new ward called Cầu Ông Lãnh (Clause 4, Article 1).
