= Xóm Chiếu =

Xóm Chiếu Phường Xóm Chiếu
- Ward
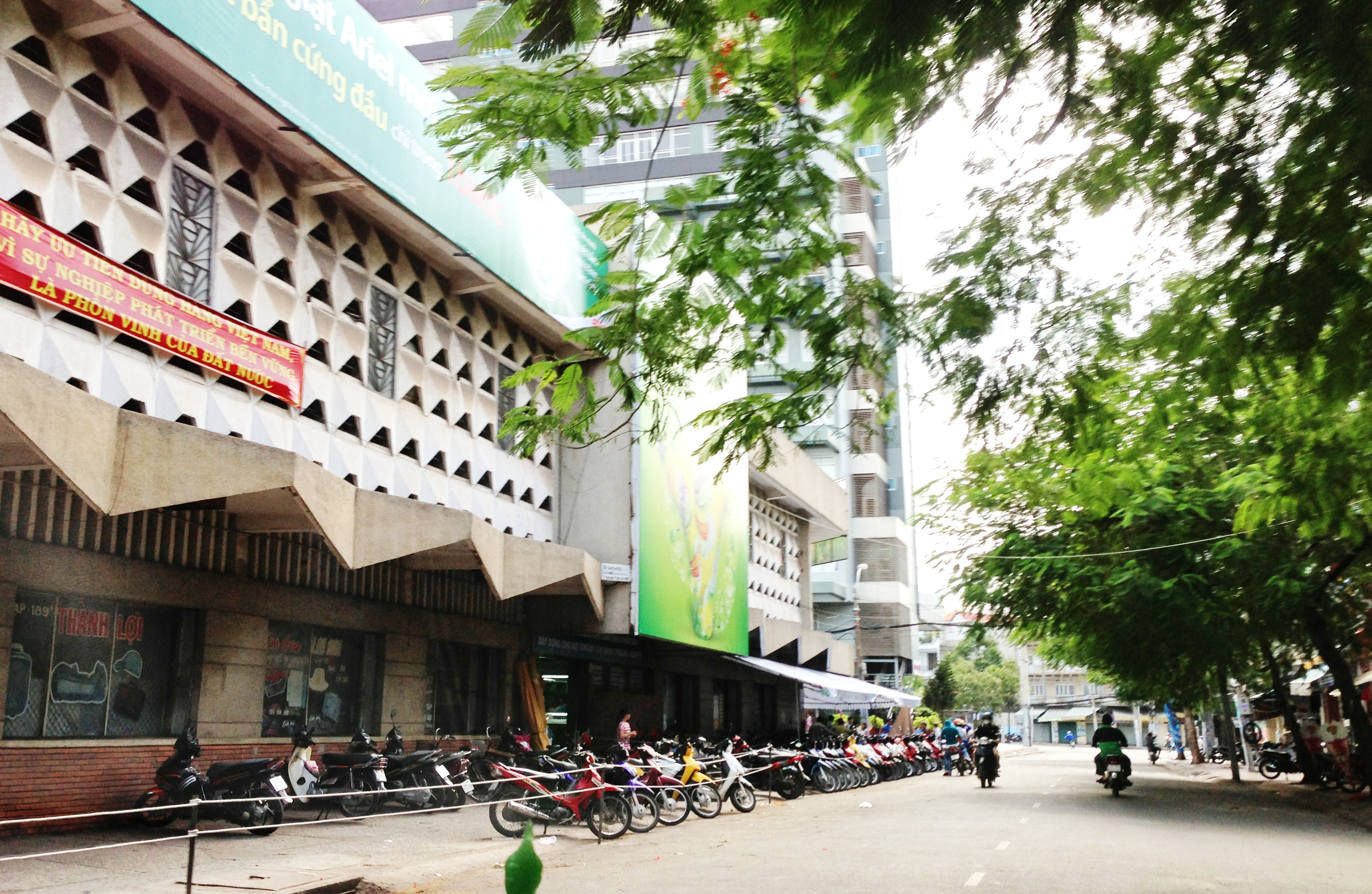
- Xóm Chiếu Market
- Interactive map of Xóm Chiếu
- Coordinates: 10°45′19″N 106°42′44″E
- Country: Vietnam
- Municipality: Ho Chi Minh City
- Established: June 16, 2025

Area
  - Total: 0.75 sq mi (1.94 km^{2})

Population (2024)
  - Total: 57,875
  - Density: 77,300/sq mi (29,800/km^{2})
- Time zone: UTC+07:00 (Indochina Time)
- Administrative code: 27259

Xóm Chiếu (Vietnamese: Phường Xóm Chiếu) is a ward of Ho Chi Minh City, Vietnam. It is one of the 168 new wards, communes and special zones of the city following the reorganization in 2025.

== Geography ==
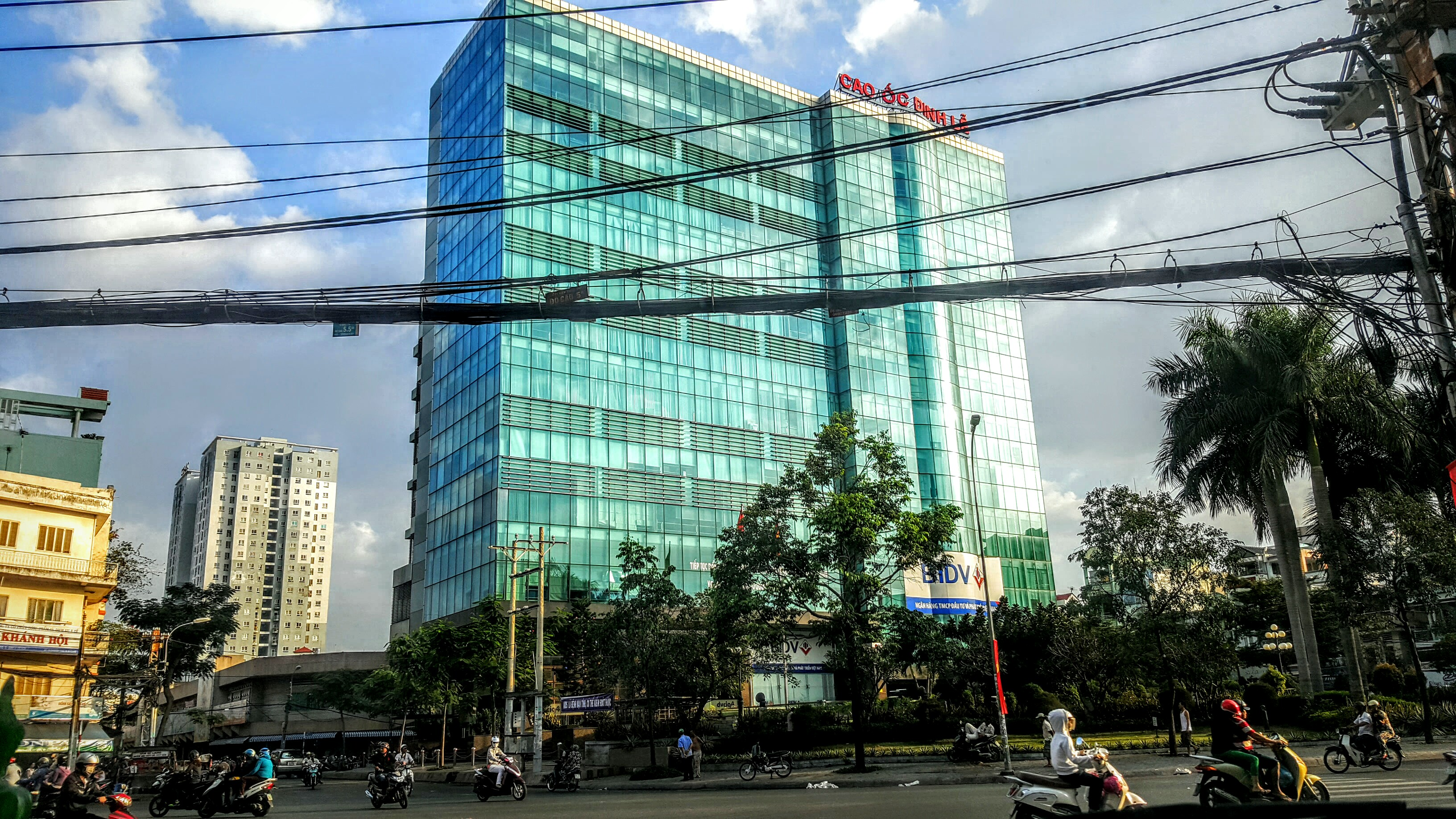
Đinh Lễ Building and Park at No.1 Đinh Lễ Street, next to Xóm Chiếu Market

Xóm Chiếu is located in central Ho Chi Minh City, borders to:

- An Khánh ward to the east by Saigon River
- Khánh Hội ward to the west by Đoàn Văn Bơ and Xóm Chiếu streets
- Tân Thuận and Tân Hưng to the south by Tẻ Channel
- Saigon and Bến Thành to the north by Bến Nghé Canal

According to Official Dispatch No. 2896/BNV-CQĐP dated May 27, 2025 of the Ministry of Home Affairs, following the merger, Khánh Hội ward has a land area of 1.94 km², population as of December 31, 2024 is 57,875 people, population density is 29,832 people/km² (statistical data as of December 31, 2024, as stipulated in Article 6 of Resolution No. 76/2025/UBTVQH15 dated April 14, 2025, of the Standing Committee of the National Assembly).

== Division ==
Xóm Chiếu is divide into 23 quarters, numbered from 1 to 23.

== History ==
On June 16, 2025, the National Assembly Standing Committee issued Resolution No. 1685/NQ-UBTVQH15 on the arrangement of commune-level administrative units of Ho Chi Minh City in 2025 (effective from June 16, 2025). Accordingly, the entire land area and population of Ward 13, Ward 16, Ward 18 and part of Ward 15 of the former District 4 will be integrated into a new ward named Xóm Chiếu (Clause 8, Article 1).
