= Khánh Hội, Ho Chi Minh City =

Khánh Hội Phường Khánh Hội Lý Nhơn
- Ward
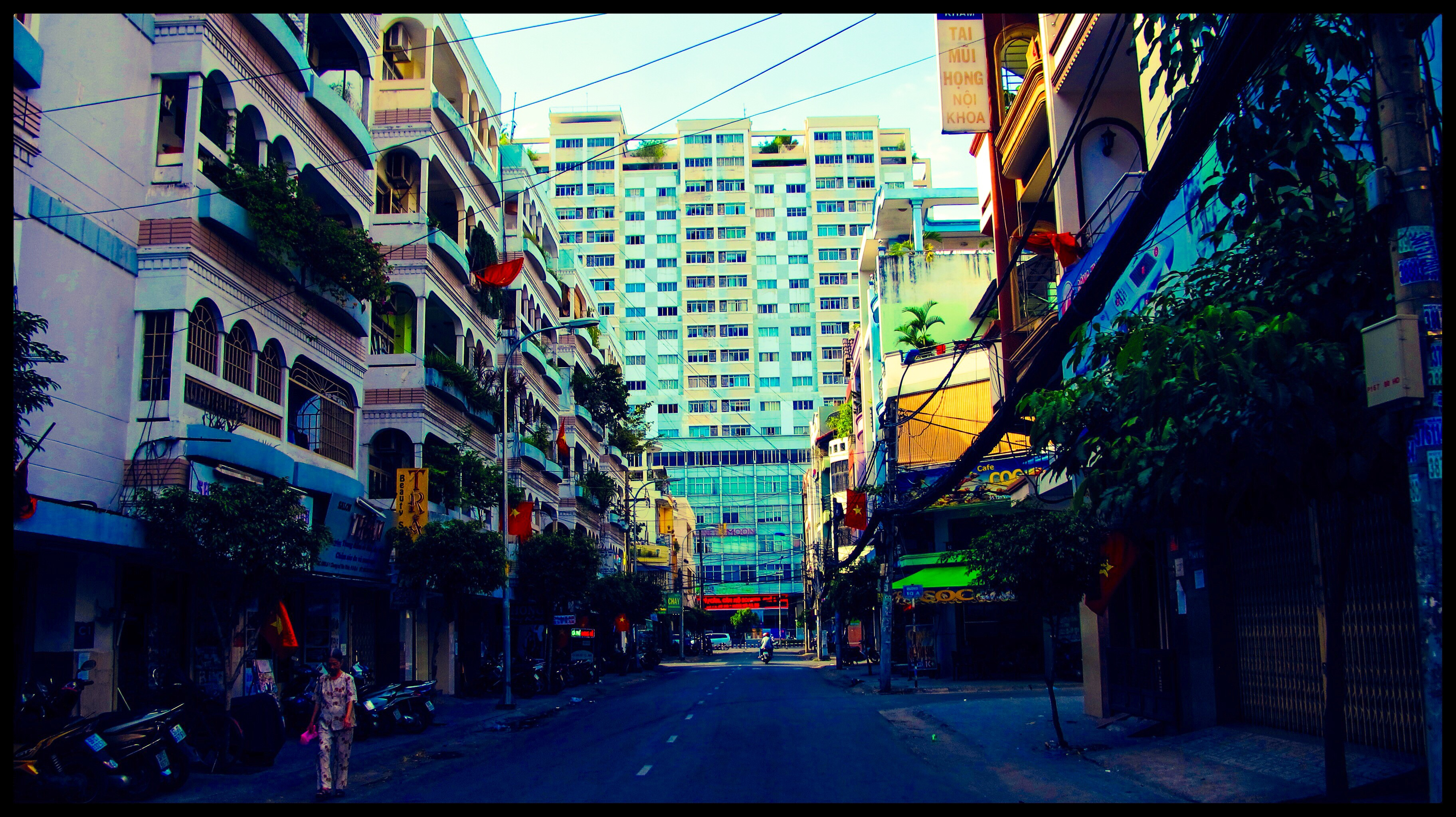
- Tân Vĩnh Street look towards to H3 Building on Hoàng Diệu Street
- Interactive map of Khánh Hội
- Coordinates: 10°45′34″N 106°42′09″E
- Country: Vietnam
- Municipality: Ho Chi Minh City
- Established: June 16, 2025

Area
  - Total: 0.41 sq mi (1.07 km^{2})

Population (2024)
  - Total: 94,507
  - Density: 229,000/sq mi (88,300/km^{2})
- Time zone: UTC+07:00 (Indochina Time)
- Administrative code: 27265

Khánh Hội (Vietnamese: Phường Khánh Hội) is a ward of Ho Chi Minh City, Vietnam. It is one of the 168 new wards, communes and special zones of the city following the reorganization in 2025.

== Geography ==
Khánh Hội is located in central Ho Chi Minh City, borders to:

- Xóm Chiếu ward to the east by Đoàn Văn Bơ and Xóm Chiếu streets
- Vĩnh Hội ward to the west by route of Tôn Đản – Vĩnh Hội – Khánh Hội
- Tân Hưng to the south by Tẻ Channel
- Bến Thành and Cầu Ông Lãnh to the north by Bến Nghé Canal

According to Official Dispatch No. 2896/BNV-CQĐP dated May 27, 2025 of the Ministry of Home Affairs, following the merger, Khánh Hội ward has a land area of 1.07 km², population as of December 31, 2024 is 94,507 people, population density is 88,324 people/km² (statistical data as of December 31, 2024, as stipulated in Article 6 of Resolution No. 76/2025/UBTVQH15 dated April 14, 2025, of the Standing Committee of the National Assembly).

As of July 1, 2025, with a population density of over 88,000 people/km², Khánh Hội ward became the commune-level administrative unit with the highest population density in Ho Chi Minh City and the highest in the whole country.

== Division ==
Khánh Hội ward is divided into 32 quarters, numbered from 1 to 32.

== History ==
On June 16, 2025, the National Assembly Standing Committee issued Resolution No. 1685/NQ-UBTVQH15 on the arrangement of commune-level administrative units of Ho Chi Minh City in 2025 (effective from June 16, 2025). Accordingly, the entire land area and population of Ward 8, Ward 9 and part of Ward 2, Ward 4, Ward 15 of the former District 4 will be integrated into a new ward named Khánh Hội (Clause 9, Article 1).

== Etymology ==
In the 2025 commune-level administrative unit arrangement, the city government has advocated to name new wards and communes with words instead of naming them with numbers. With many considerations from the history of the land, familiarity and cultural values. This policy has been widely supported by the people.

Accordingly, Khánh Hội is the name of an olden place in this area.
