= Tân Hưng, Ho Chi Minh City =

Tân Hưng Phường Tân Hưng Tân Quy Đông
- Ward
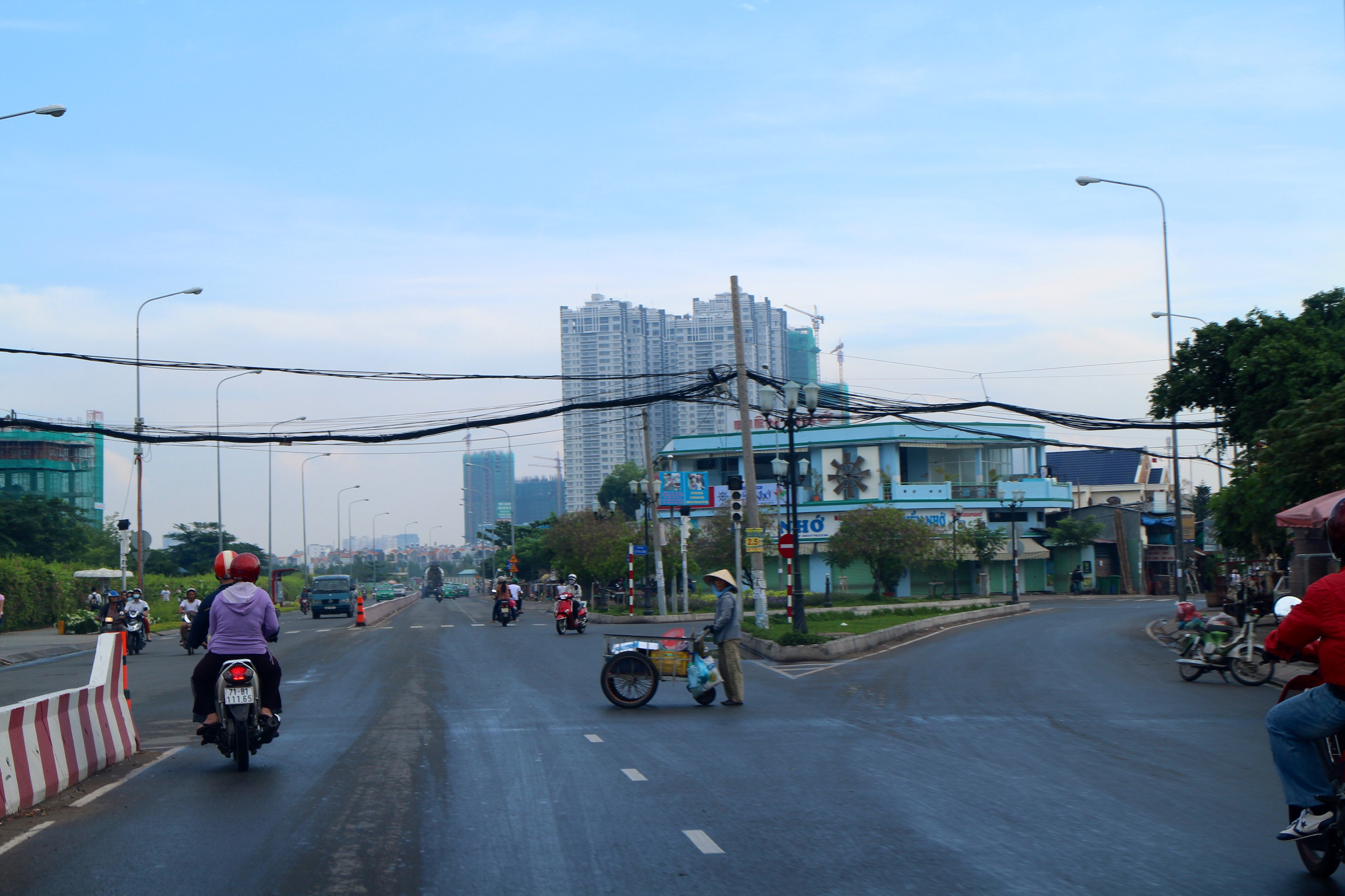
- Tân Hưng ward skyline, seen from Nguyễn Hữu Thọ and Lê Văn Lương intersection towards Kênh Tẻ Bridge
- Interactive map of Tân Hưng
- Coordinates: 10°44′23.6″N 106°42′12.7″E
- Country: Vietnam
- Municipality: Ho Chi Minh City
- Established: June 16, 2025

Area
  - Total: 3.30 sq mi (8.54 km^{2})

Population (2024)
  - Total: 153,674
  - Density: 46,600/sq mi (18,000/km^{2})
- Time zone: UTC+07:00 (Indochina Time)
- Administrative code: 27475

Tân Hưng (Vietnamese: Phường Tân Hưng) is a ward of Ho Chi Minh City, Vietnam. It is one of the 168 new wards, communes and special zones of the city following the reorganization in 2025.

== Geography ==
Tân Hưng is located in the urban core of Ho Chi Minh City, 5 km to the south of Saigon, it has the following geographical location:

- To the east, it borders to Tân Thuận by Lâm Văn Bền street
- To the southeast, it borders Tân Mỹ by Nguyễn Thị Thập street and Thầy Tiêu creek
- To the south, it borders Nhà Bè by Rạch Đỉa creek
- To the east, it borders Chánh Hưng and Bình Hưng by Ông Lớn creek
- To the north, it borders Vĩnh Hội, Khánh Hội and Xóm Chiếu by Tẻ canal.

According to Official Dispatch No. 2896/BNV-CQĐP dated May 27, 2025 of the Ministry of Home Affairs, following the merger, Tân Hưng has a land area of 8.54 km², the population as of December 31, 2024 is 135,674 people, the population density is 17,994 people/km².

== History ==
On June 16, 2025, the National Assembly Standing Committee issued Resolution No. 1685/NQ-UBTVQH15 on the arrangement of commune-level administrative units of Ho Chi Minh City in 2025 (effective from June 16, 2025). Accordingly, the entire land area and population of Tân Phong, Tân Quy, Tân Kiểng and Tân Hưng wards of the former District 7 will be integrated into a new ward named Tân Hưng (Clause 21, Article 1).

== Education ==
=== Universities ===
In the plan for the Saigon South Urban Development, the Zone B is University Village, it located in the former area of Tân Phong ward and Bình Hưng, the Zone B in Tân Hưng including institutions of:

- People's Police University: 36 Nguyễn Hữu Thọ Road
- Tôn Đức Thắng University: 19 Nguyễn Hữu Thọ Road
  - Vietnam Finland International School
- Royal Melbourne Institute of Technology Vietnam (RMIT): 702 Nguyễn Văn Linh Parkway
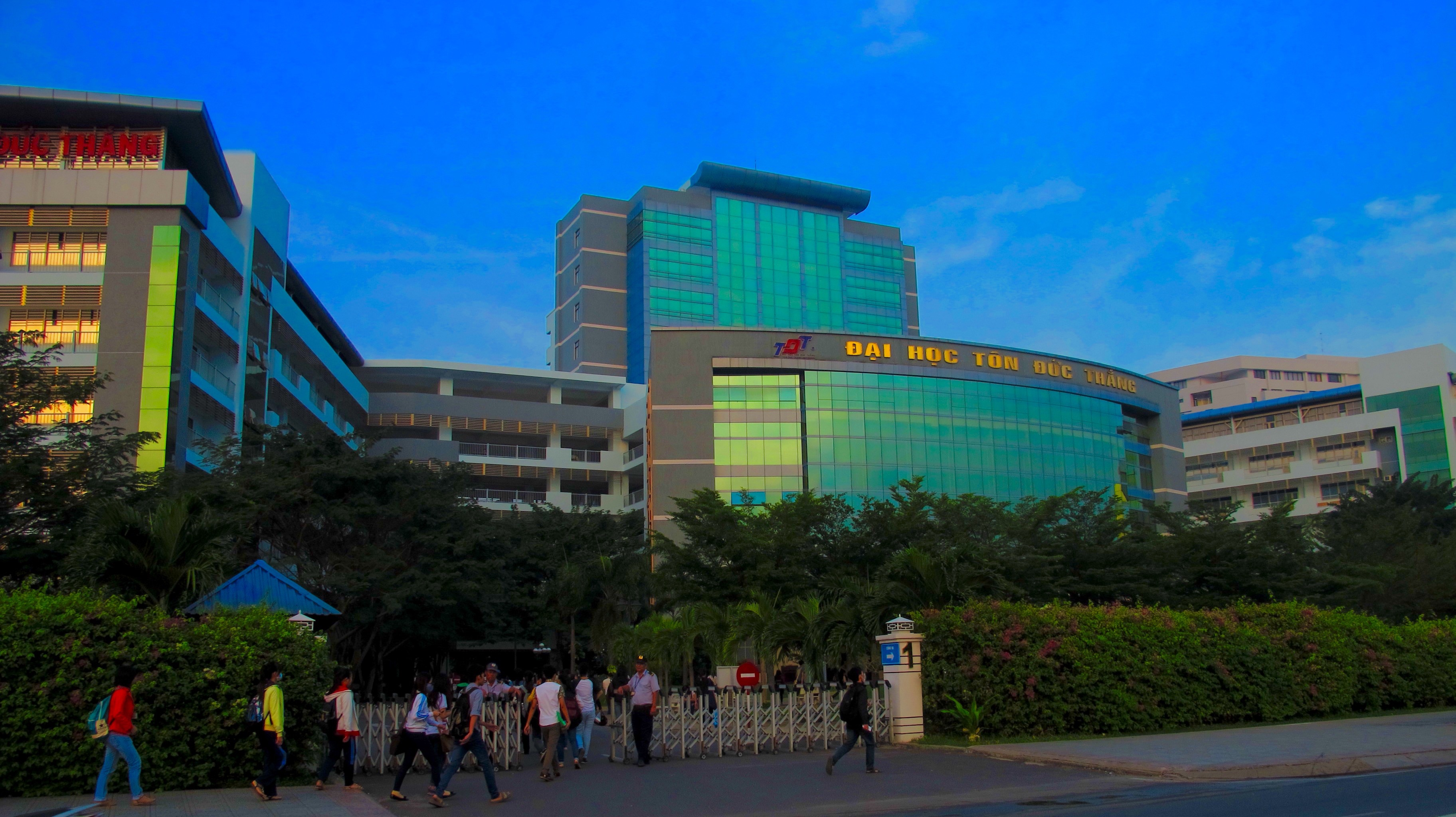
Tôn Đức Thắng University, Tân Phong Campus (Headquarters)

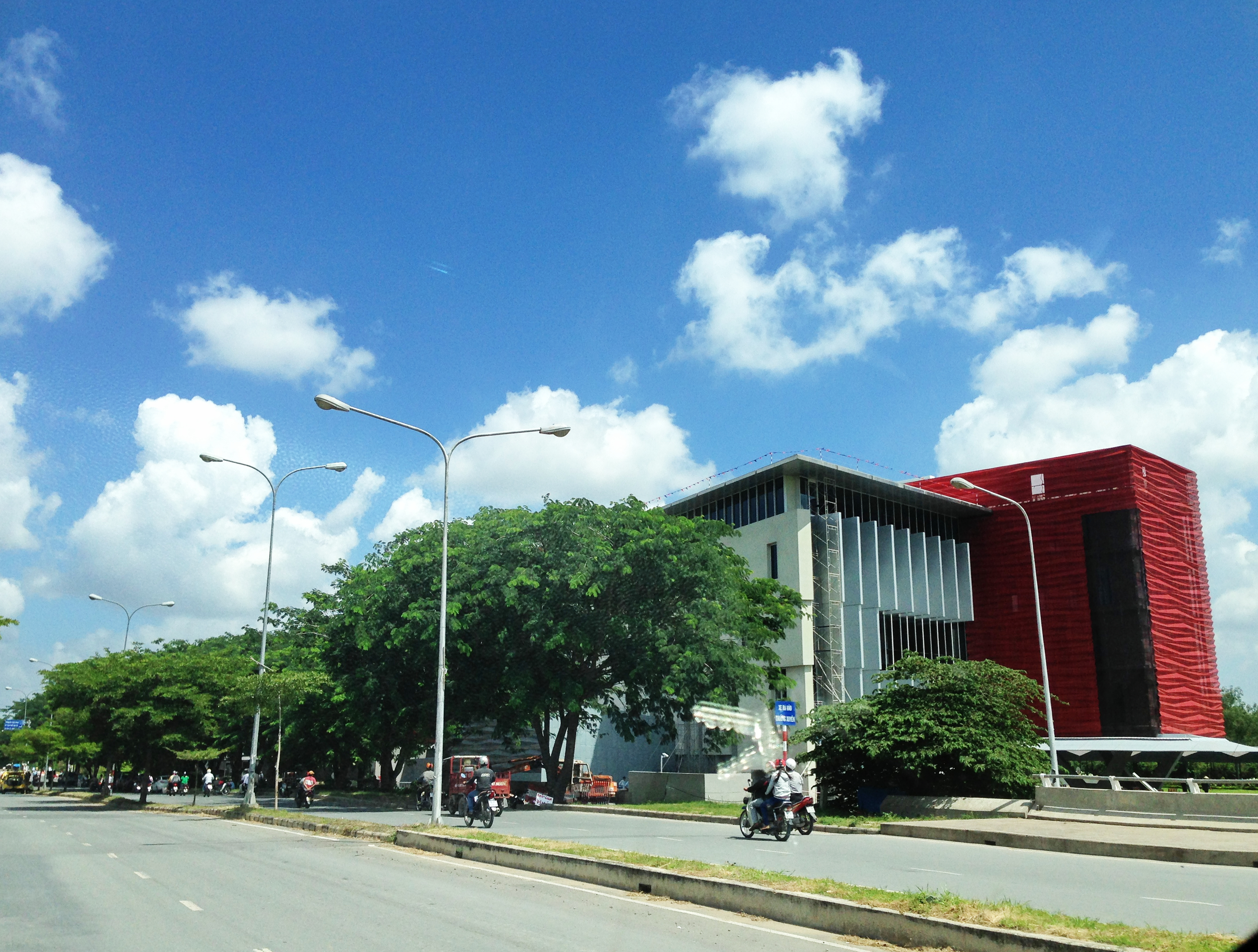
RMIT Vietnam, Saigon South Campus

=== Schools ===
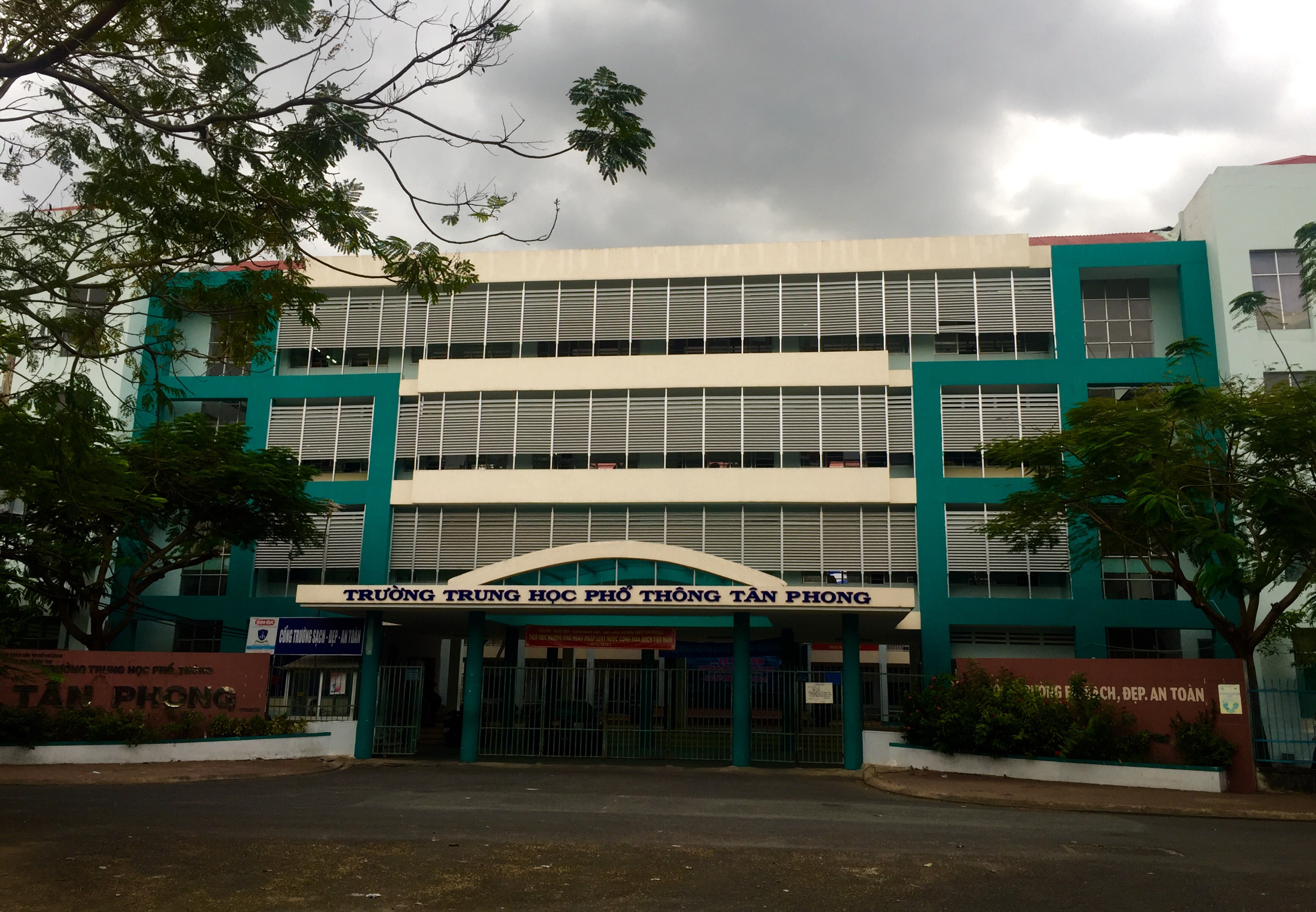
Tân Phong High School

Beside the universities, some notable schools in the ward are: Tân Phong High School, Lawrence S. Ting Memorial School, Saigon South International School

== Economy ==
Tân Hưng ward with the adjacent Tân Mỹ ward, together formed the Zone A of Phú Mỹ Hưng Urban Area, which is the heart of the southern Ho Chi Minh City, is a bustling commercial district with many companies have their offices here, some notable names are: Tân Thuận Industrial Promotion Company Ltd., VNPT Nam Sài Gòn, Nhà Bè Water Supply JSC, Khai Hoan Land, Mapletree Investments, Lotte Mart, the Vietnam-Korea Times was once located here before moved to The Sun Avenue Buildings in Bình Trưng. And also with numerous banks open their branches and transactions here.

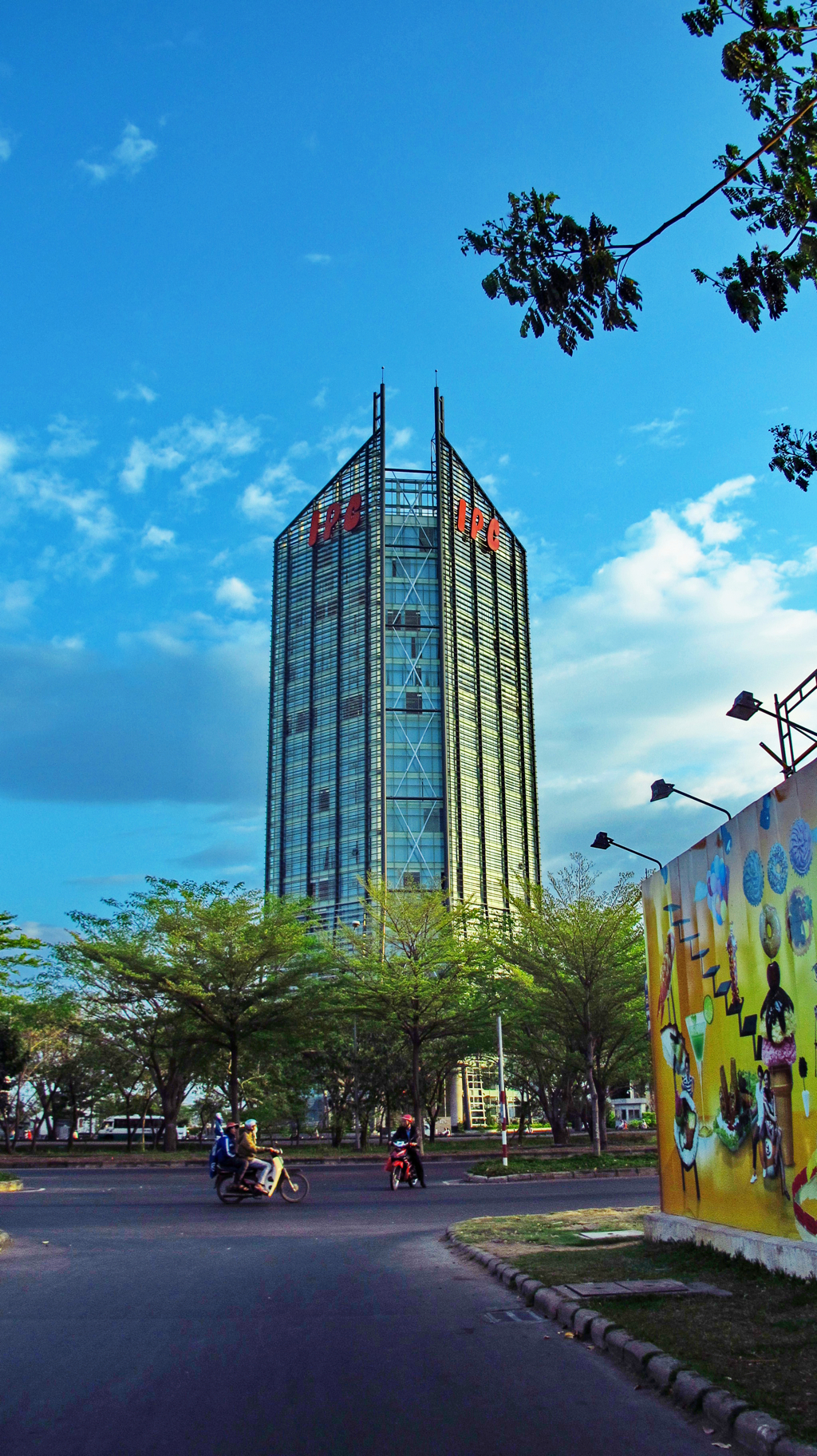
Tân Thuận Industrial Promotion Company Ltd. (IPC) Building and Headquarters

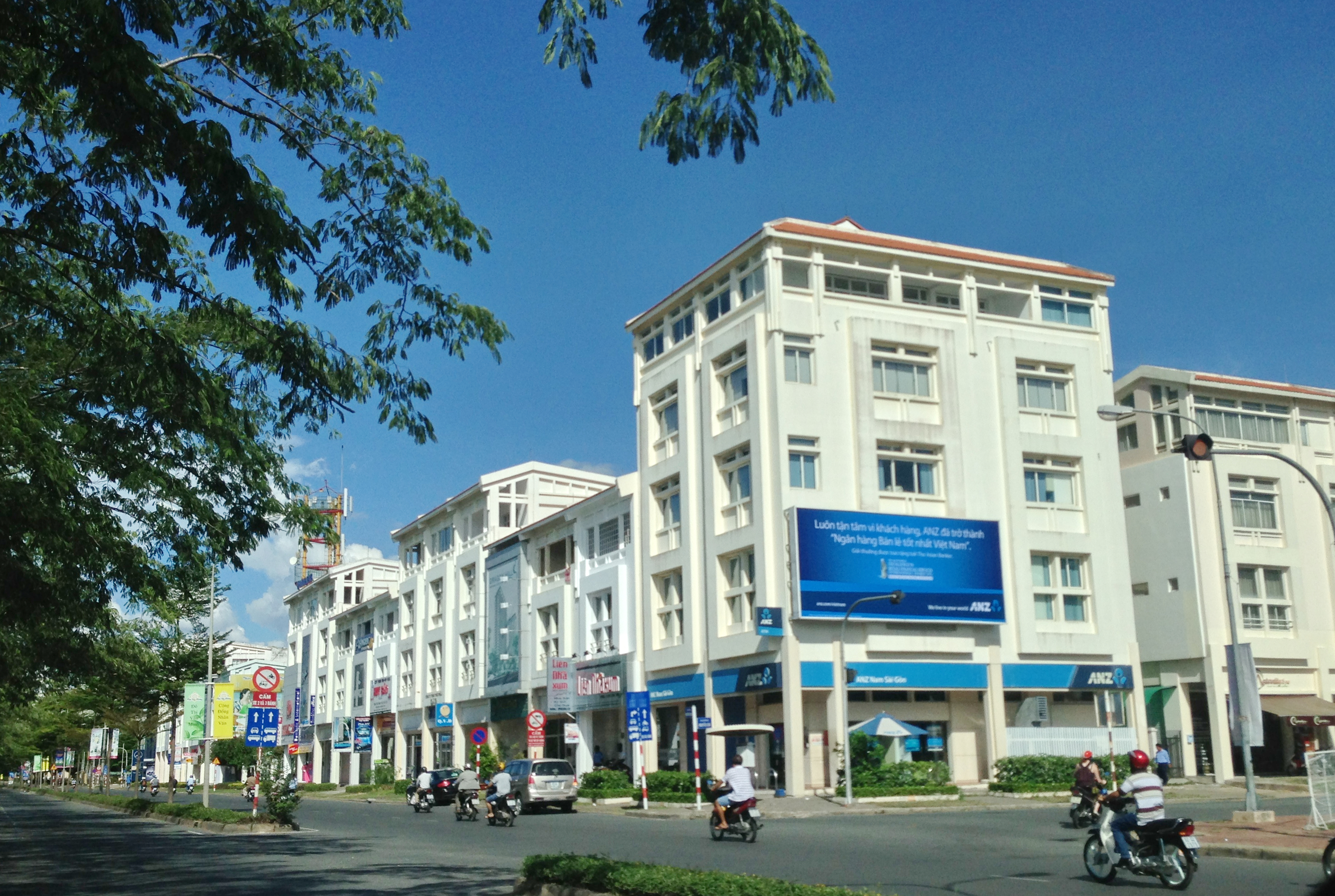
Shophouses in Phú Mỹ Hưng with the Shinhan Bank Phú Mỹ Hưng branch (formerly ANZ Vietnam)

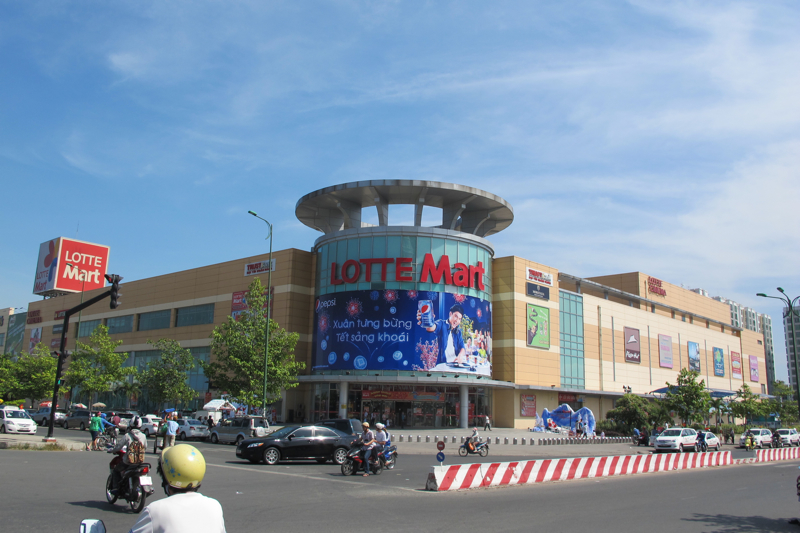
Lotte Mart South Saigon at corner of Nguyễn Hữu Thọ – Nguyễn Thị Thập

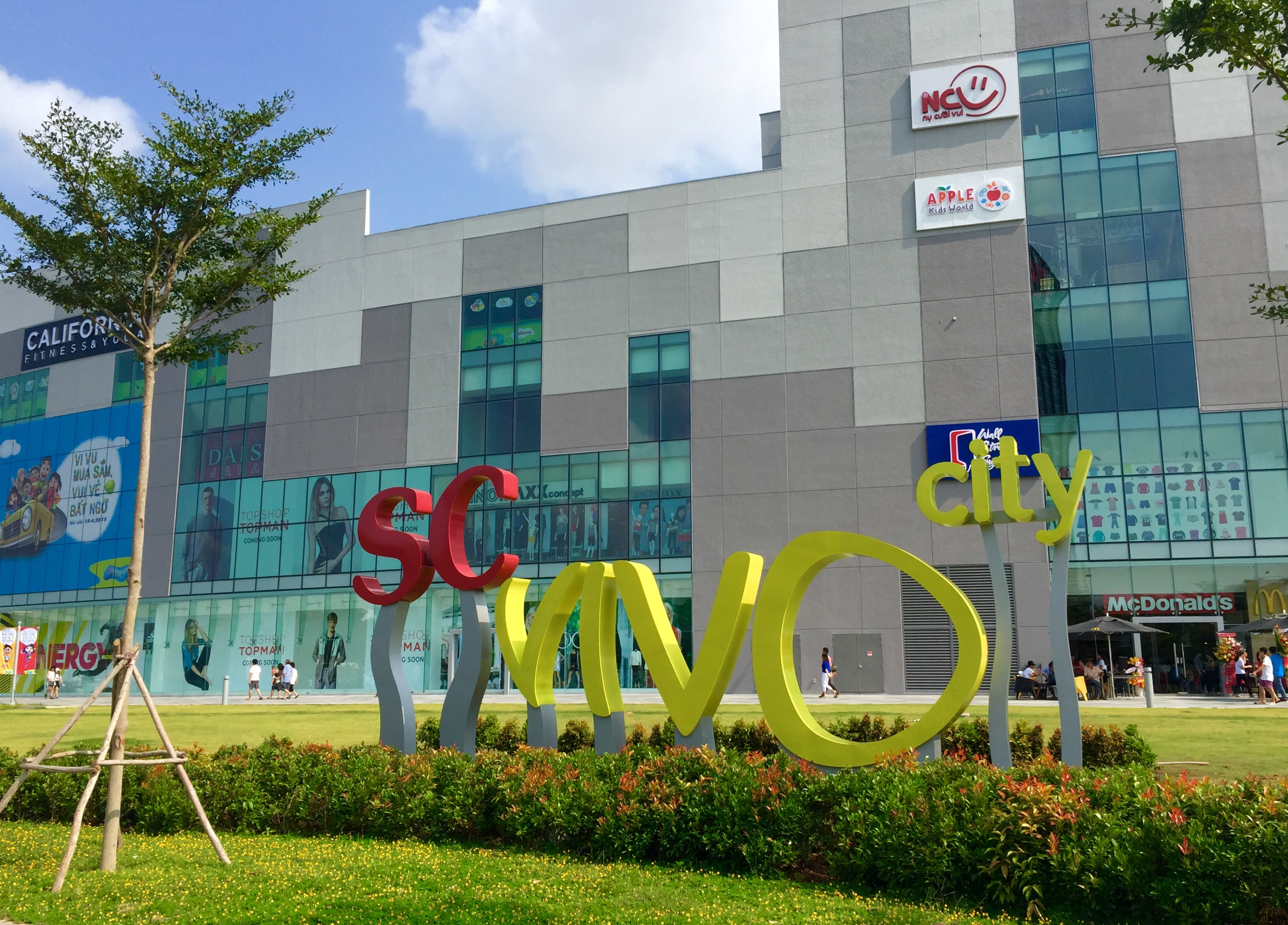
SC VivoCity, part of Saigon South Place, a joint-venture complex between Mapletree Investments and Saigon Co.op

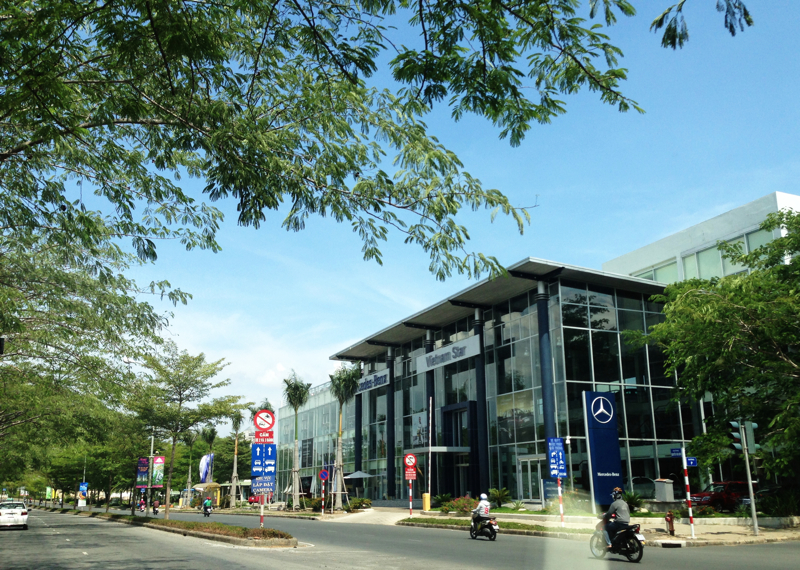
A Mercedes-Benz showroom on Nguyễn Văn Linh Parkway

The ward has two major shopping centers, Lotte Mart South Saigon and SC VivoCity. Lotte Mart South Saigon was the first Lotte Mart to open in Vietnam, and the company's Vietnam headquarters is also located here.

== Housing developments ==
In addition to the existing residential area, new developments have been built in the ward, including Phú Mỹ Hưng, Him Lam, Saigon South Place by Mapletree, and Sunrise City by Novaland Group. Phú Mỹ Hưng has a large foreign population, including residents from South Korea, Taiwan, Japan, the United Kingdom, and the United States, and several international schools are located in the area.

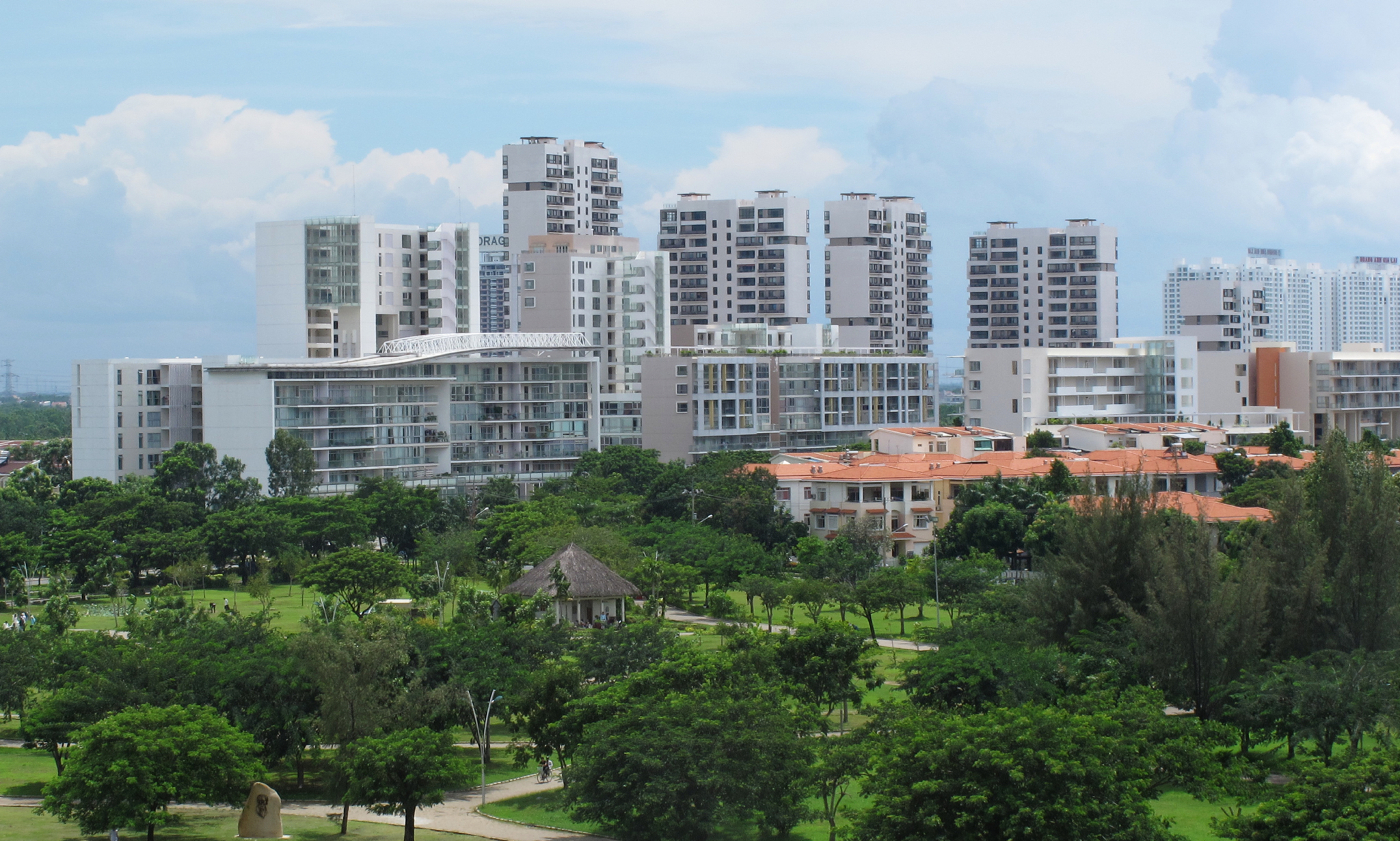
Hillview District – Phú Mỹ Hưng urban area

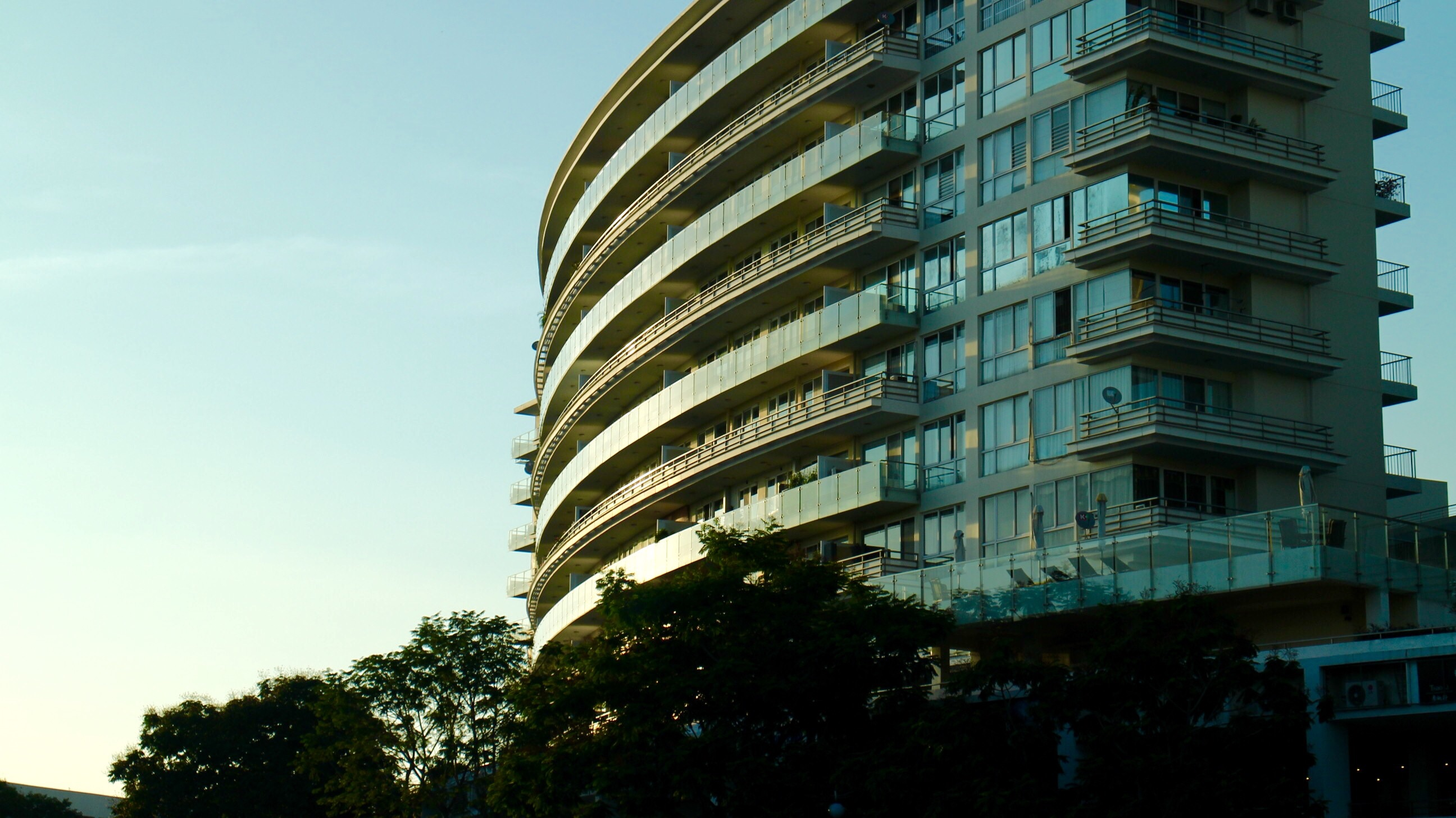
Grand View Apartment

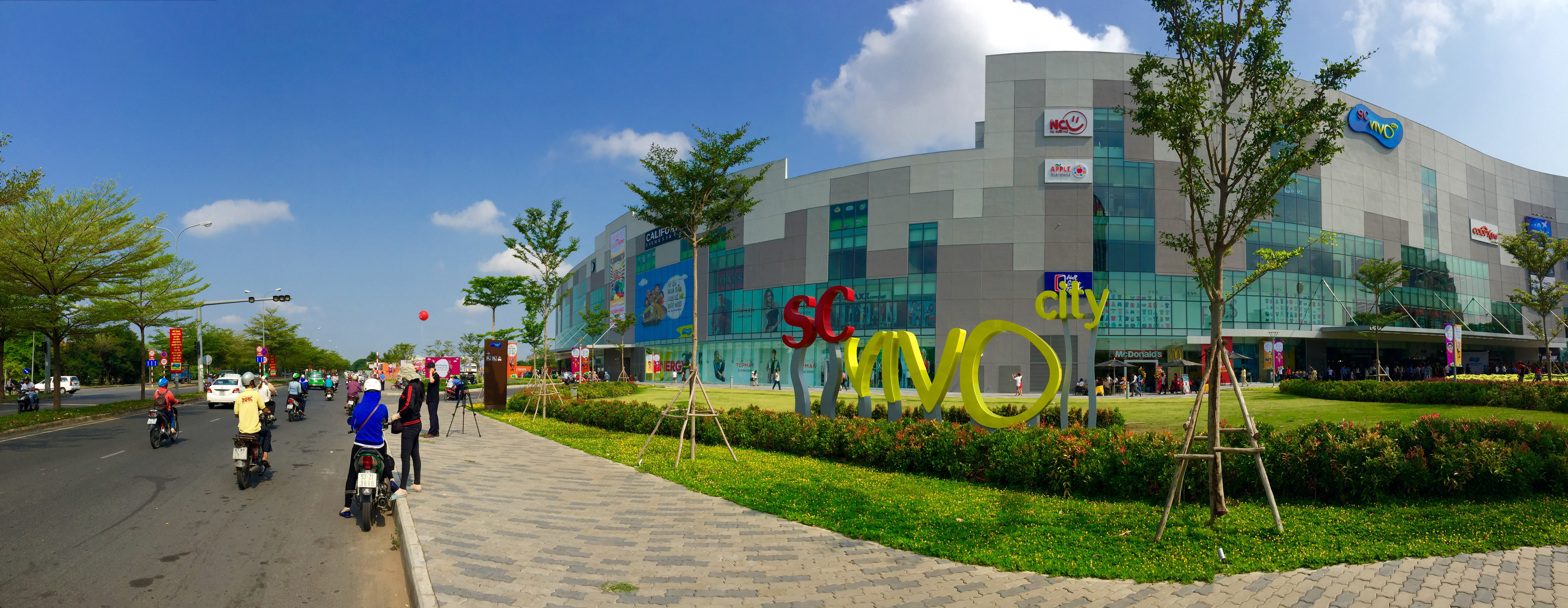
Saigon South Place

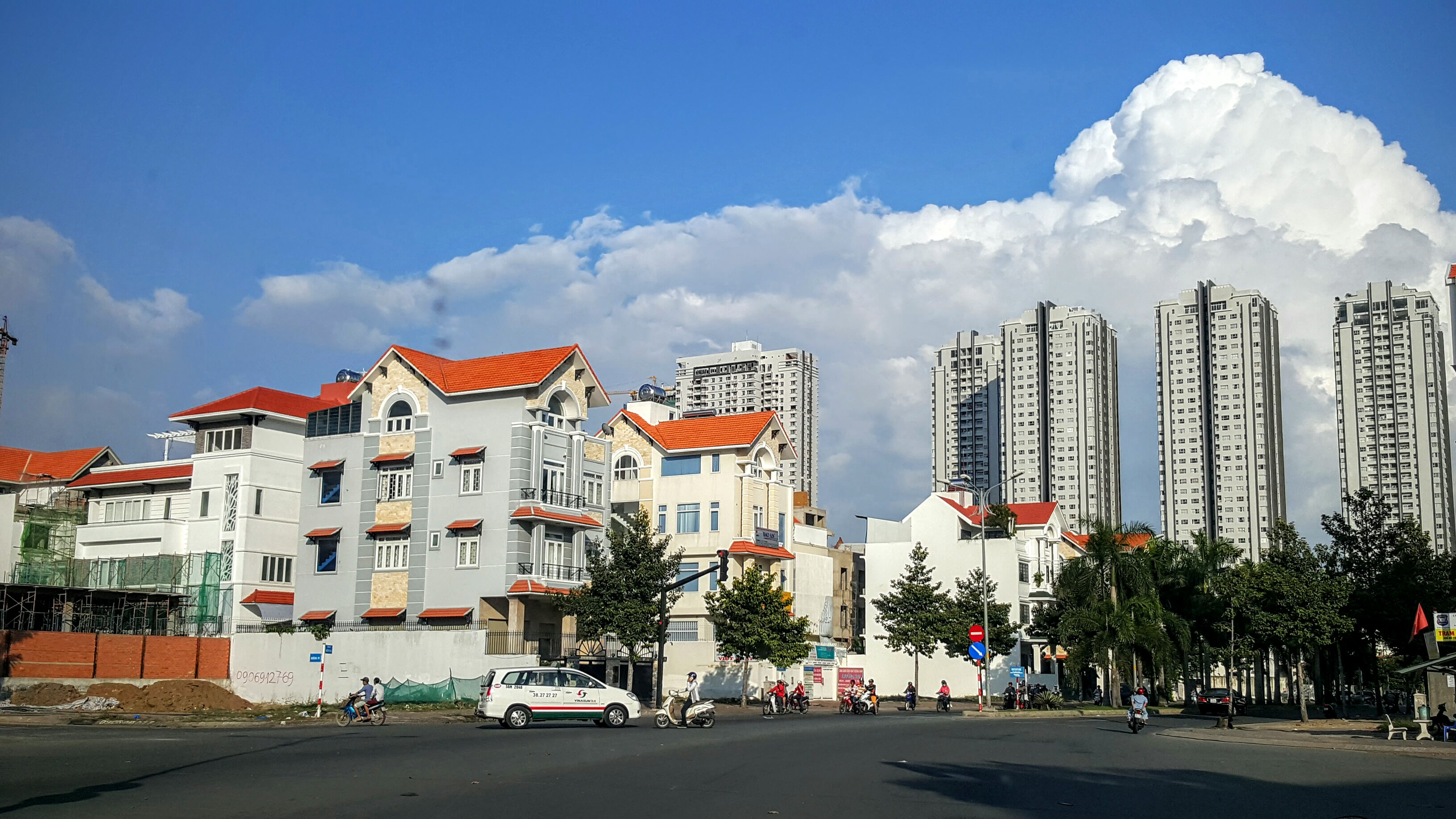
Him Lam Urban Area

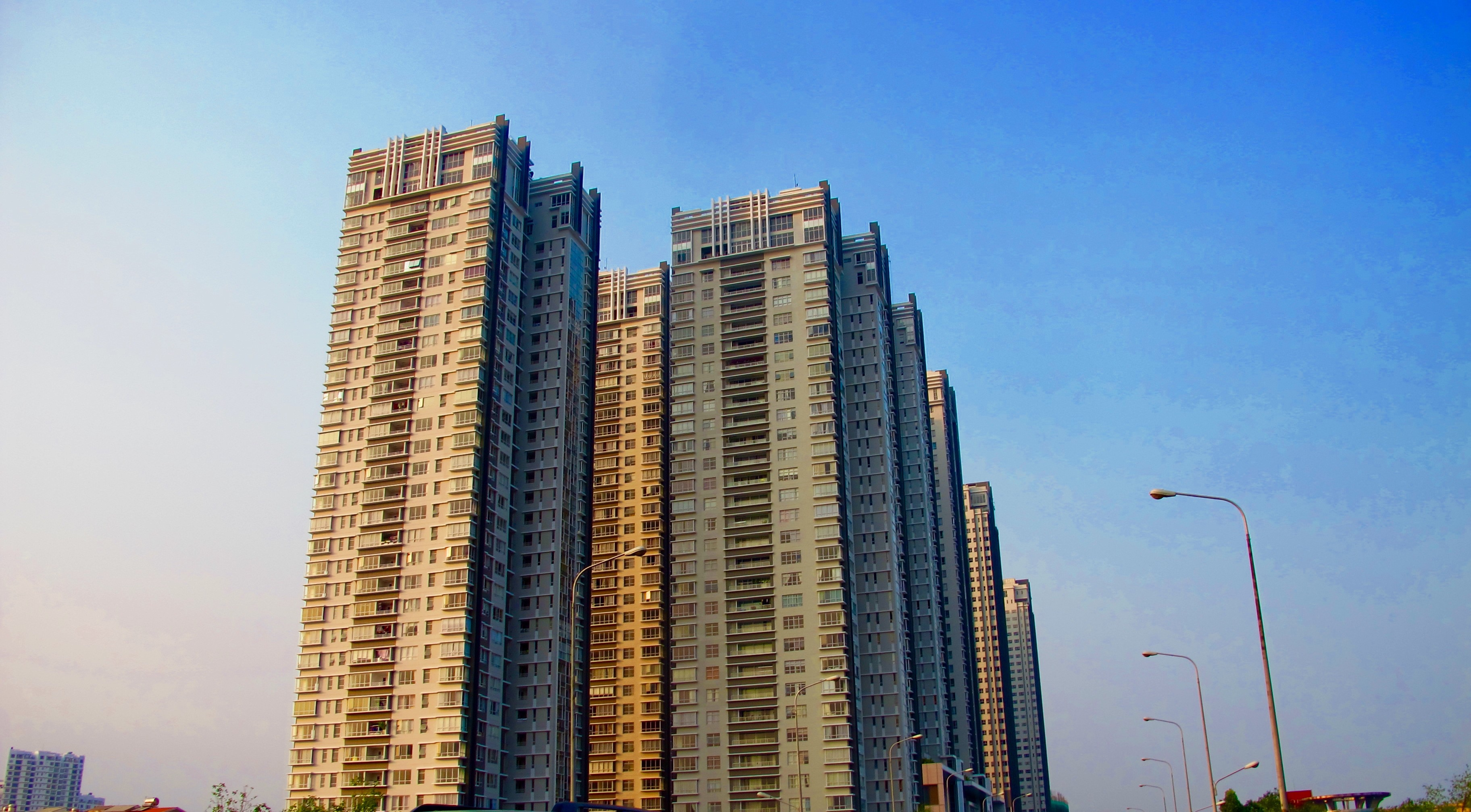
Sunrise City

== Gallery ==
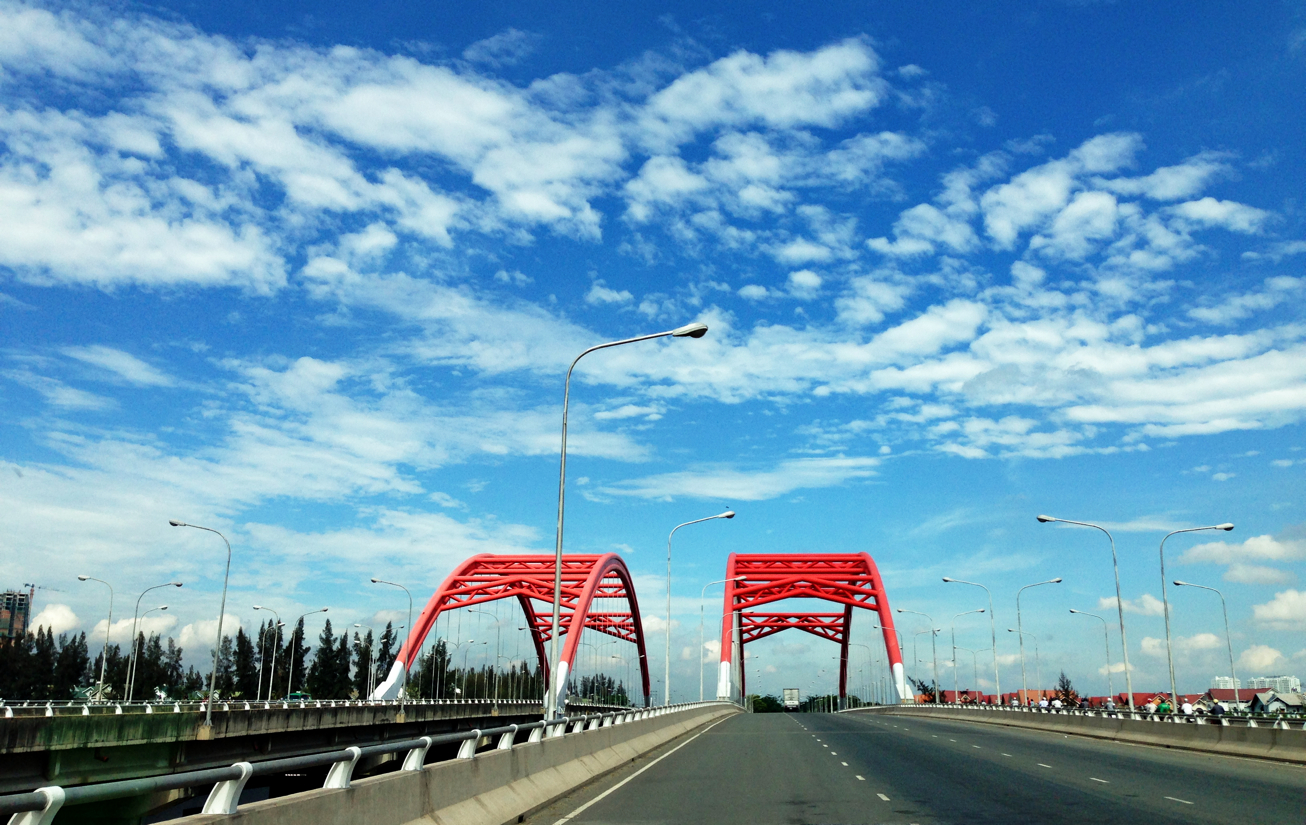
Ông Lớn Bridge crosses the same name canal

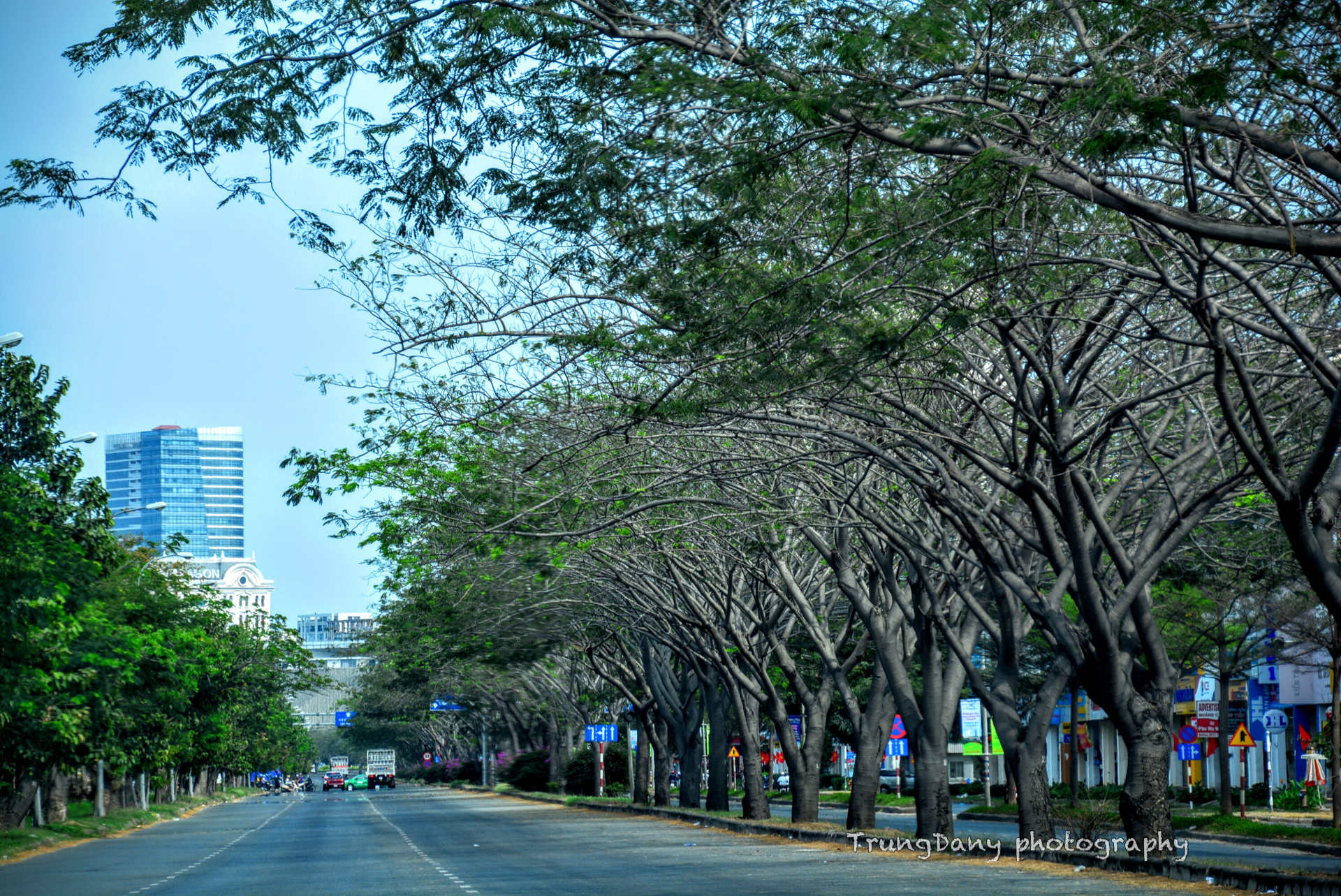
Nguyễn Văn Linh Parkway

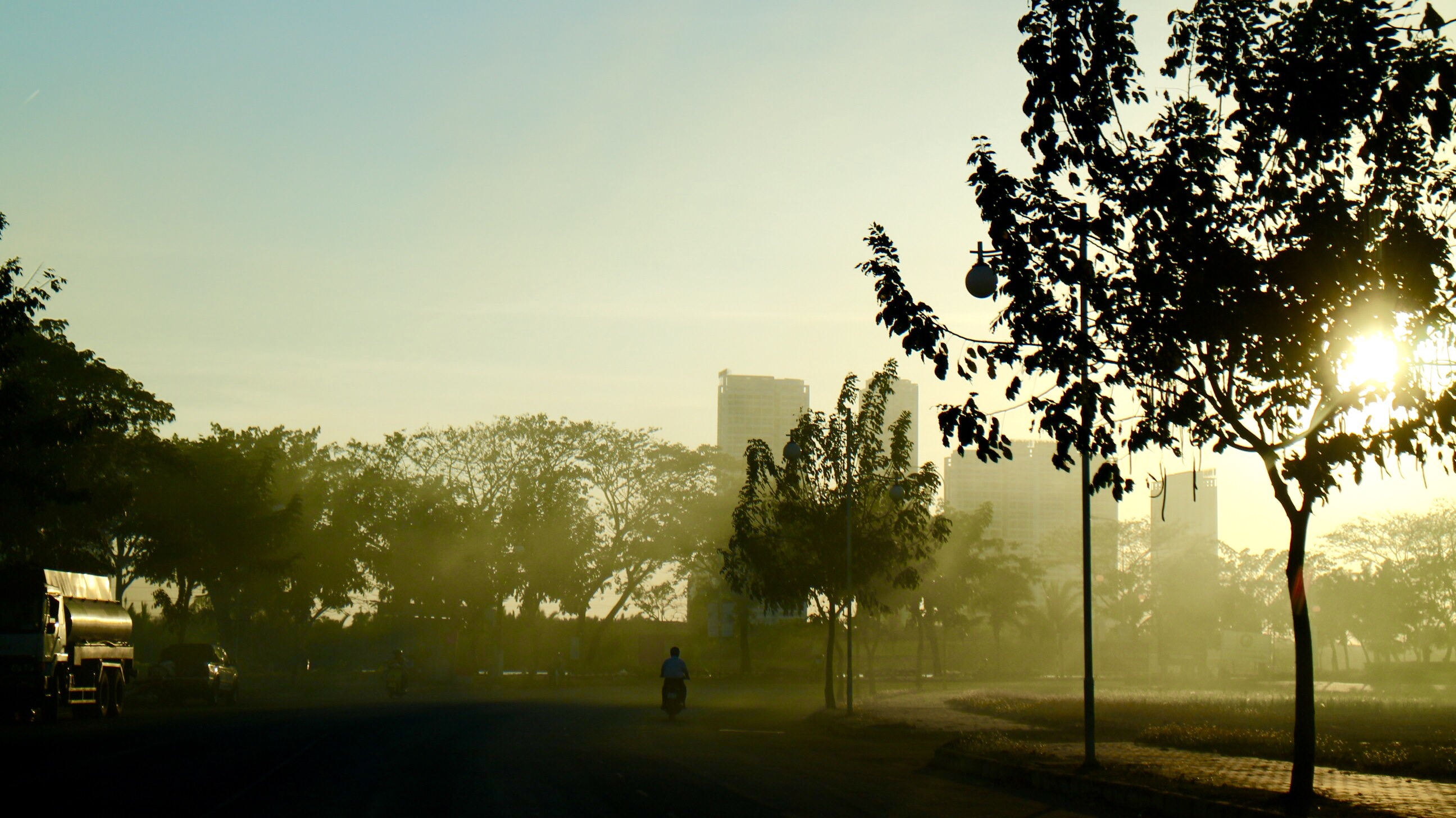
Nguyễn Đức Cảnh Street

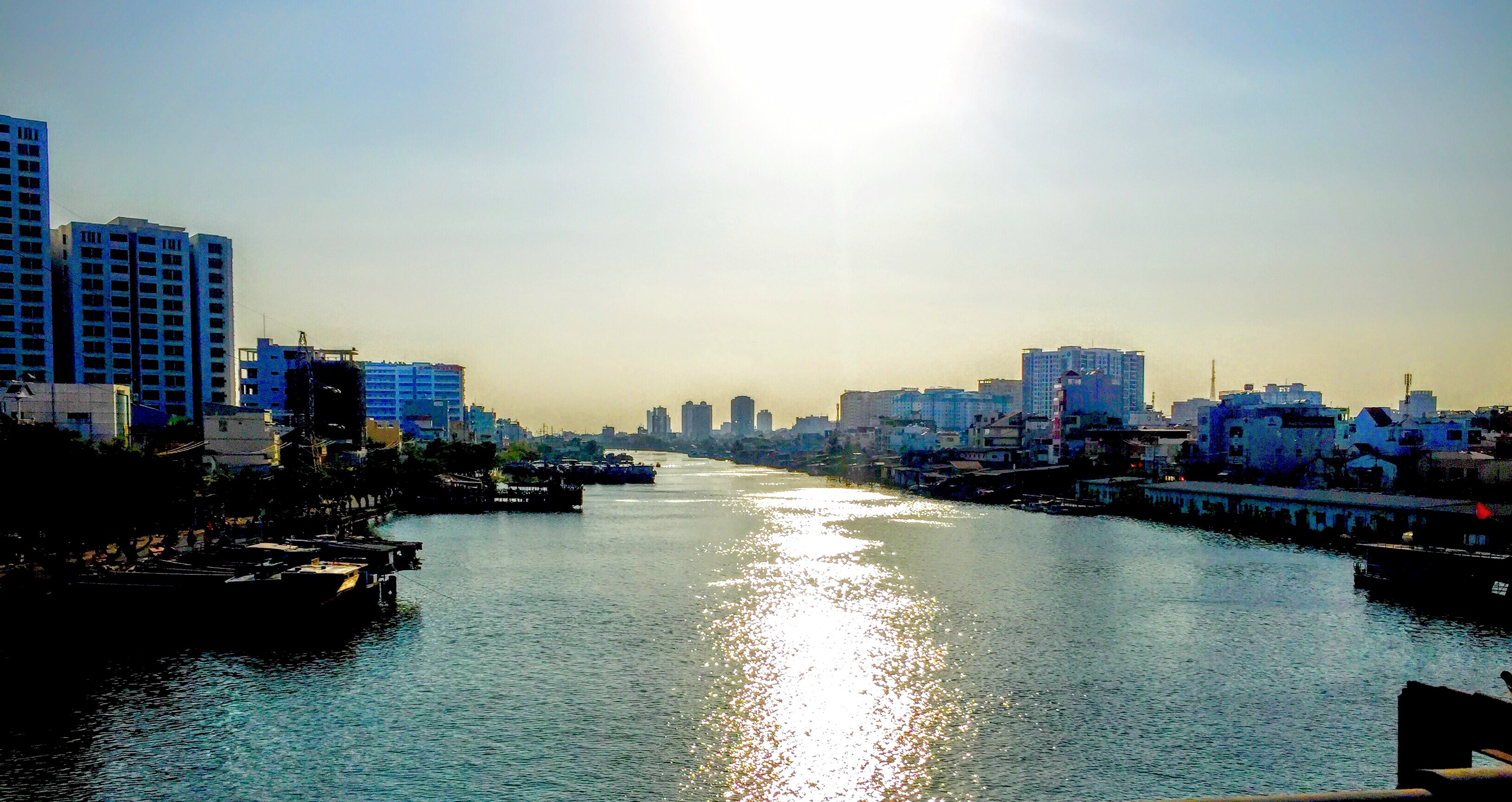
Tẻ Channel

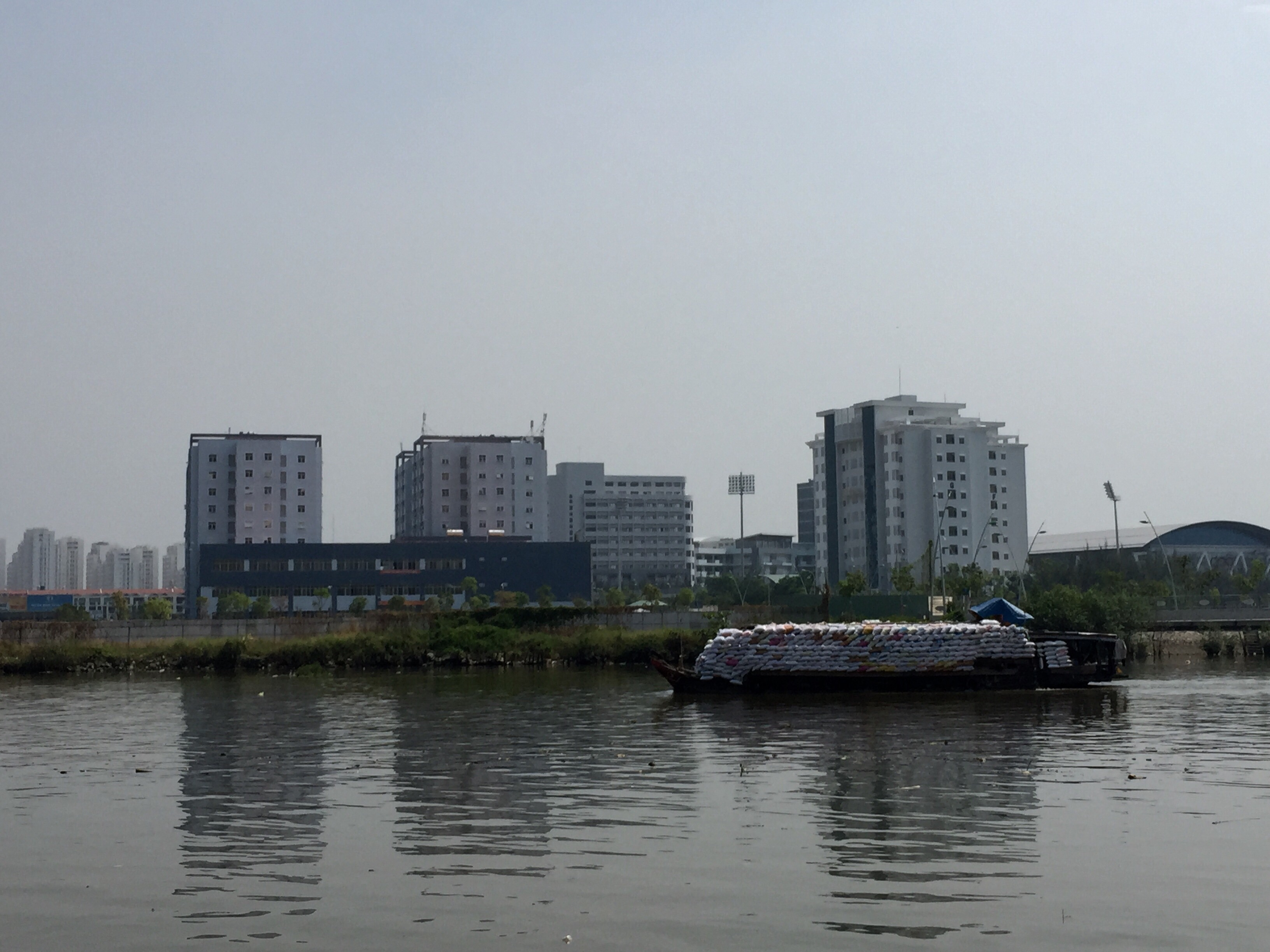
Ông Lớn Canal
