= APU International School =

Vietnamese school

APU American International School
- Ho Chi Minh City; Vietnam

Information
- Type: International School
- Motto: Your Pathway to US Universities.
- Established: Secondary School: 2004; Primary School: 2007
- Founder: Binh Thy Nguyen Tran
- School district: Phu Tho Ward
- Teaching staff: 100
- Grades: K-12
- Enrollment: 1000
- Colors: Blue, gold
- Mascot: Eagle
- Accreditation: WASC candidate, Ministry of Education and Training (Vietnam) accredited
- Student to faculty ratio: 25:1
- Average class size: 25
- Website: www.apu.edu.vn

Secondary School

Location
- 286 Lanh Binh Thang St; Ho Chi Minh City; Vietnam

Information
- Motto: “Your Pathway to US Universities”
- School district: Phu Tho Ward
- Chairwoman: Binh Thy Nguyen Tran
- Grades: 6-12
- Enrollment: 300 (2016–2017)
- Affiliations: College Board member
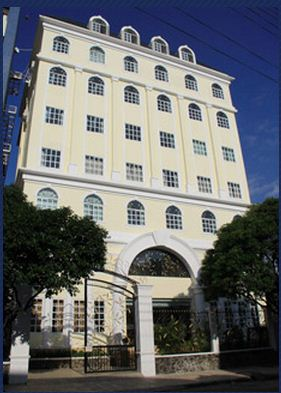
- Lanh Binh Thang Secondary School Campus

Primary School

Location
- 501 Lac Long Quan St. Ho Chi Minh City; Vietnam

Information
- School district: Hoa Binh Ward
- Grades: K-5
- Enrollment: 100 (2016–2017)
- Accreditation: None
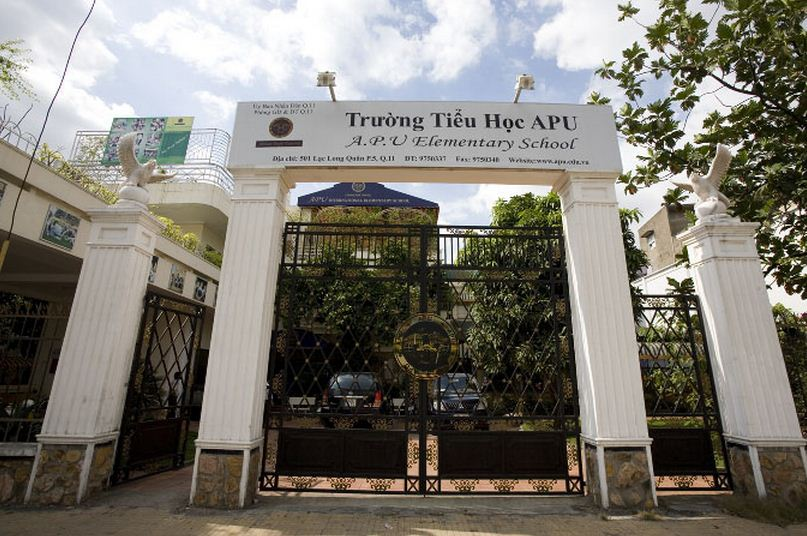
- Lac Long Quan Primary School Campus

The APU International School (APUIS) is a school in Vietnam licensed by the Ministry of Education and Training to provide American education to K-12 students using the California curriculum. Currently, the school has two campuses and boarding facilities, one located in Ho Chi Minh City (Saigon) and one in Da Nang City, Vietnam.

The school is privately owned by the APU Educational Development Group and is non-sectarian. APU is a member of the College Board, and is authorized to offer the SAT, Advanced Placement (AP), PSAT and the ACT exams.

== History ==
APU American International School was founded in 2004 by the APU Educational Development Group.

Initially, only welcoming twenty students to the Lanh Binh Thang campus in Ho Chi Minh City,. i

Since then, it has expanded to include a separate elementary school campus in the district 11 area of Ho Chi Minh City and a new campus for university in Da Nang, Vietnam in 2015, now with the capacity to accommodate over 900 students. Since its inception, over 1,200 students have been sent abroad to US universities through APU's network of support since 1996.

APU American International School, a subsidiary of APU Educational Development Group, serves Vietnamese as well as expatriate students who are seeking to gain admission to universities and colleges in the United States by partnering with them in test preparation, college financial planning, college admissions coaching, as well as providing concurrent enrollment advanced college credit courses for high school students. The school has received generous support from US universities and colleges in the form of scholarships, opportunities for study abroad in the United States, faculty exchange programs and concurrent enrollment programs that allow students to earn college credit while still enrolled in high school. Graduates at APU have annually gone on to win generous scholarships from universities in the United States. Annually, the valedictorian has been awarded full scholarships from a growing number of APU affiliate institutions, such as Roger Williams University, The University of Missouri–Kansas City, and Central Washington University.

== Academics ==
Classes at APUIS are held Monday through Friday, and occasionally on Saturdays. APU uses a traditional American-based grading system and credits are calculated following the Carnegie Credit system. Students are required to take courses in the arts, classical or modern languages, computer science, English, natural science, history and mathematics. There is a long tradition of merit based scholarship awards to graduates, usually allotted at the graduation ceremony.

The medium of instruction is in English, although Vietnamese local nationals are required to take some Vietnamese courses that align with standards set by the Ministry of Education and Training. There is also a support program offered for early state English language learners. APU offers both AP college credit courses as well as English language development programs.

The faculty are predominantly American along with faculty from around the world. Many clubs and organizations exist at APU and students also participate in community service programs in the region.

=== English language development ===
APU International School offers an English Language Development (ELD). The program consists of nine levels of instruction: an introductory level for students without prior ELD experience followed by eight levels of instruction, each focused around progressively more challenging degrees of English proficiency.

== Facilities ==
APU American International School includes two operating campuses with dormitories in Ho Chi Minh city and APU American International School Da Nang Campus, and two construction projects in Cu Chi and Dalat.

=== Main campus ===
Located in District 11, this campus houses the middle and high school comprising grades 6 to 12. Campus facilities include a science laboratory, separate music and art rooms, a canteen, a library, computer labs, a bookstore, an assembly hall and over 50 classrooms. Classrooms are fitted with a work area for the homeroom teacher, and desktop computers. The surrounding area includes access to an indoor gymnasium, outdoor basketball court and weight room.

Recently APU expanded the middle high school and built an eight-story building adjacent to the current campus, increasing student capacity from 300 to a 1000 students. A sky bridge connects one building to the other on each floor.

=== Elementary school campus ===
The campus has twelve classrooms that can accommodate roughly 250 students.

=== Boarding facilities ===
APU International School offers a boarding program.

=== College bridge program ===
APU International College Bridge Program (CBP) gives students an opportunity to experience college coursework and earn college credit before graduating from high school. It allows high school students to boost their academic profile as well as save time and money from future study abroad expenses. There has been a boom in the number of Vietnamese students studying in the United States, and most families in this category often cite cost as the number one barrier. CBP allows families to save one or two years in earning their bachelor's degrees, which translates into a cost savings of up to $80,000 for the family.

=== Virtual courses ===
This program offers students flexibility in scheduling the start date of enrollment, scheduling lessons and completing coursework. All course materials and supplies are mailed to students and are available online (except third-party textbooks). Students are given access to a personal homepage from which they can access online study guides, take exams, submit assignments, view financial standing, view messages sent by the school, view grade history and access online blogs, chat groups, discussion boards and career services. The Virtual High School is regionally accredited by the Middle States Commission on Secondary School and nationally accredited by the Distance Education and Training Council.

=== Exchange programs ===
APU American International School offers students an immersion experience in Vietnam. APU currently partners with a public secondary school in Maine, U.S.

APU American International School periodically offers a special topic course on the history and culture of Vietnam. Students and faculty from both the United States and Vietnam traverse the country from South to North on a two-week immersion program where they visit and interact directly with the places and people discussed within the course.

=== US summer college tour ===
Each summer, APU International School organizes a tour of the United States for a limited number of students. This tour provides students with first-hand experience of American culture and the education system.
