= District 4, Ho Chi Minh City =

District 4 Quận 4
- Urban district
- Seal

- Position in HCMC's core

- Location within Vietnam
- Coordinates: 10°45′42″N 106°42′9″E
- Country: Vietnam
- Centrally governed city: Ho Chi Minh City
- Seat: 5 Đoàn Như Hài, Ward 13, District 4, Ho Chi Minh City, Vietnam
- Wards: 13 wards

Area
  - Total: 4.18 km^{2} (1.61 sq mi)

Population (2022)
  - Total: 199,329
  - Density: 47,700/km^{2} (124,000/sq mi)

Demographics
  - Main ethnic groups: predominantly Kinh
- Time zone: UTC+07 (ICT)
- Website: quan4.hochiminhcity.gov.vn

District 4 (Vietnamese: Quận 4, Quận Tư) was the smallest urban district (quận) of Ho Chi Minh City, the largest city in Vietnam. The Saigon Port is located here.

As of 2010, the district had a population of 183,261 and a total area of 4 km^{2}. A number of large apartment buildings have been built over the past decade in District 4 including Rivergate Residence, Millenium, Galaxy 9, and Icon 56.

== Geographical location ==
District 4 is a triangular cay, surrounded by rivers and canals. It bordered the city of Thủ Đức to the northeast by Saigon River, District 1 to the northwest by Bến Nghé Channel, and District 7 with District 8 to the south by Tẻ Canal.

There were 10 wards in District 4.

Before January 11, 1985, the district consisted of five wards:

- Vĩnh Hội Ward (which is now divided into four wards numbered 1–4)
- Lý Nhơn Ward (which is now divided into part of both wards numbered 9 and 8)
- Cây Bàng Ward (which is now divided into two wards, numbered 9 and 10)
- Xóm Chiếu Ward (which is now divided into three wards, numbered 13 and part of 15)
- Khánh Hội Ward (which is now divided into three wards, 16, 18 and part of 15)

On December 9, 2020, Ward 5 was merged into Ward 2 and Ward 12 was merged into Ward 13.

As time went on, these wards split up into between two and four wards each, now giving a total of 10 wards, numbered 1–18. Wards 5, 6, 7, 11, 12, 14, 17 and 18 is no longer exist.
