= District 10, Ho Chi Minh City =

District 10 Quận 10
- Urban district (obsolete)
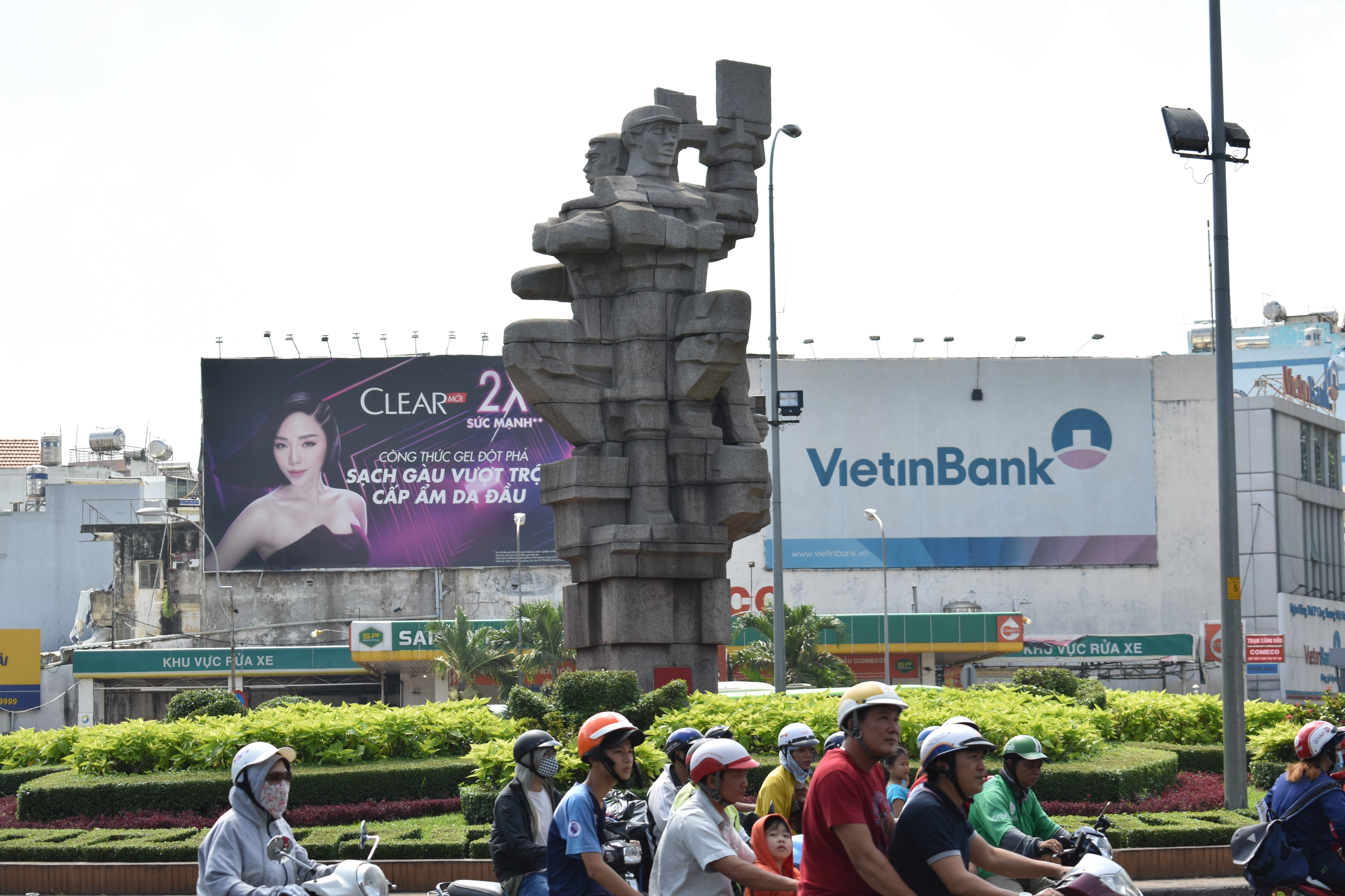
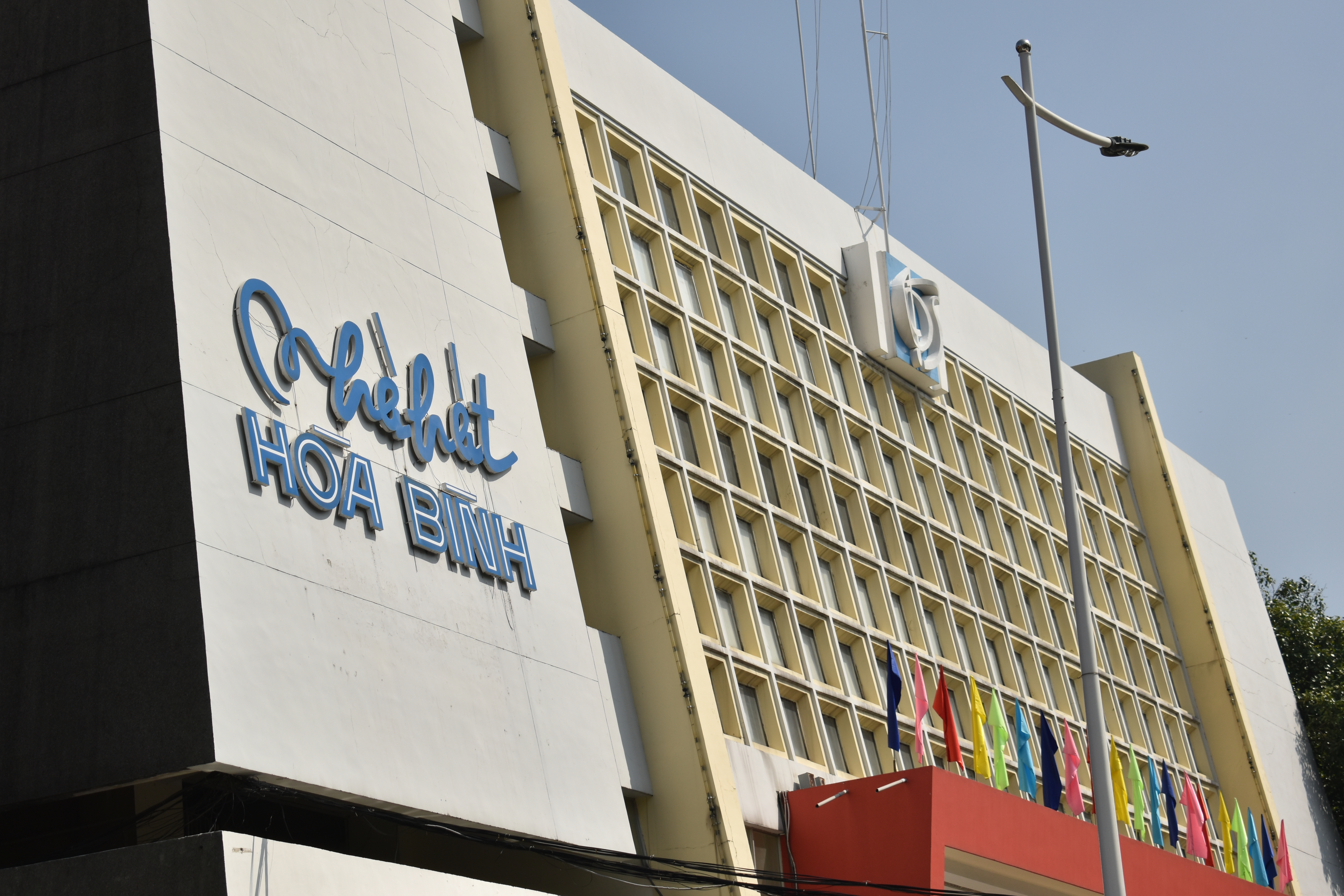
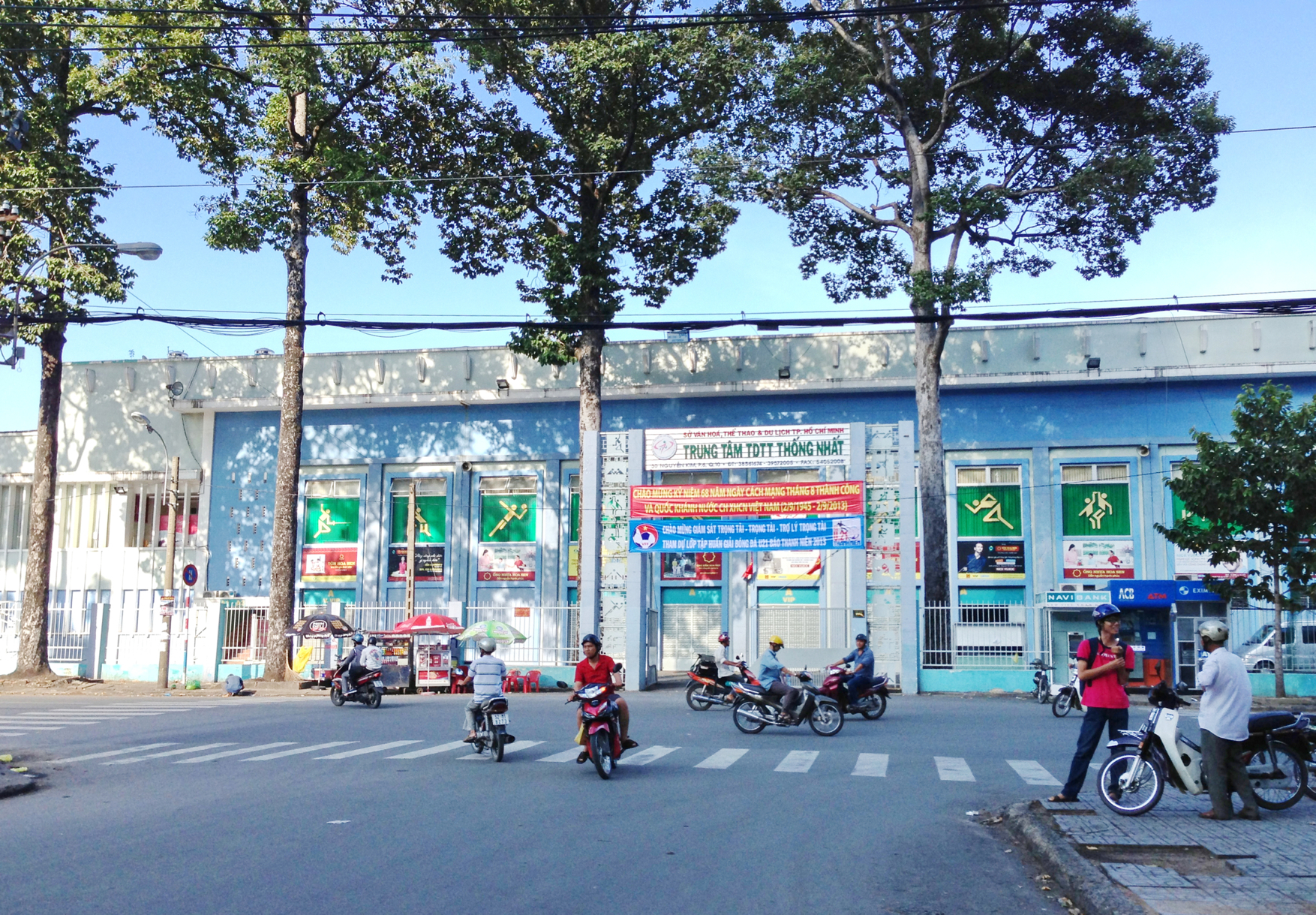
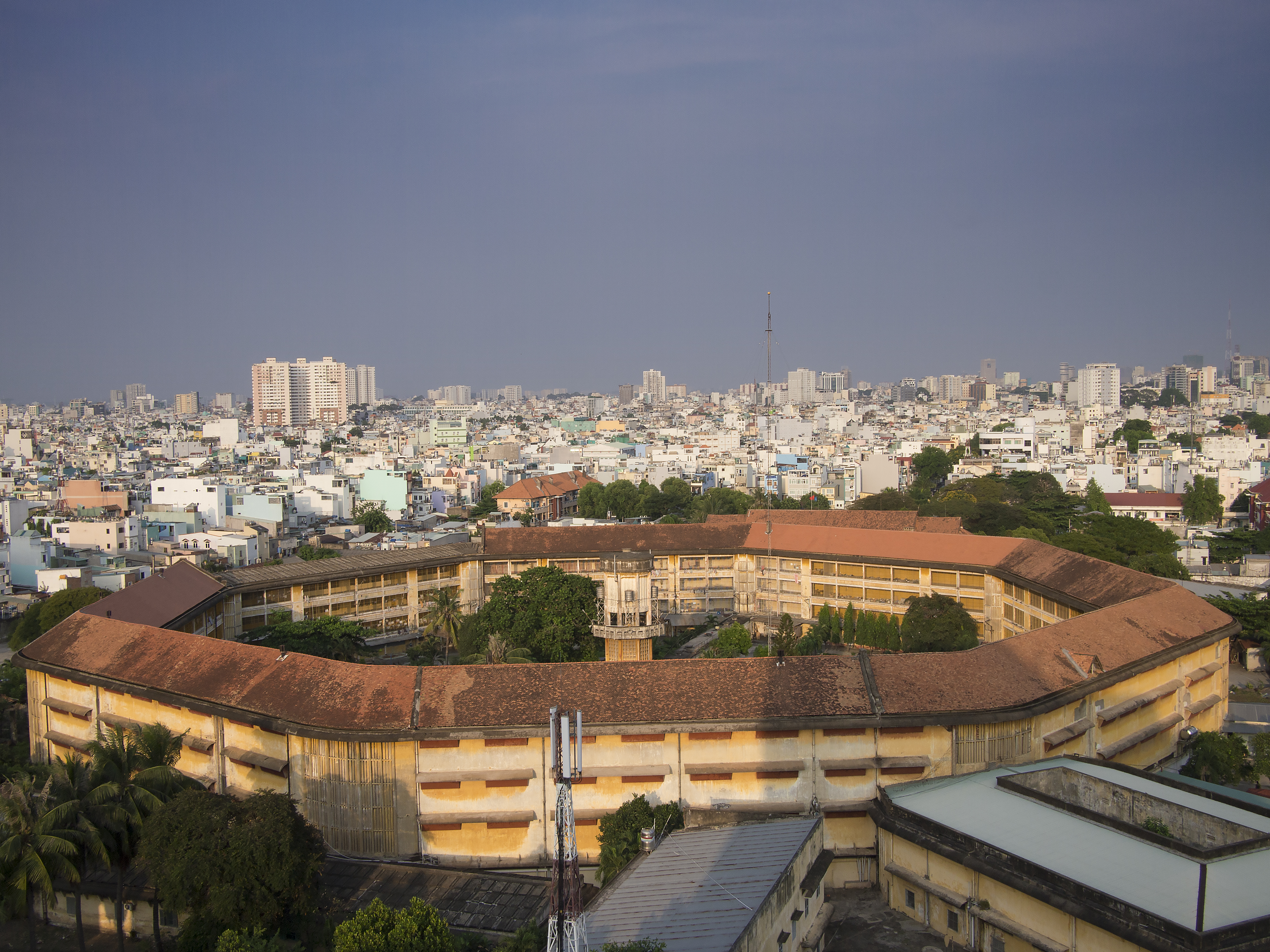
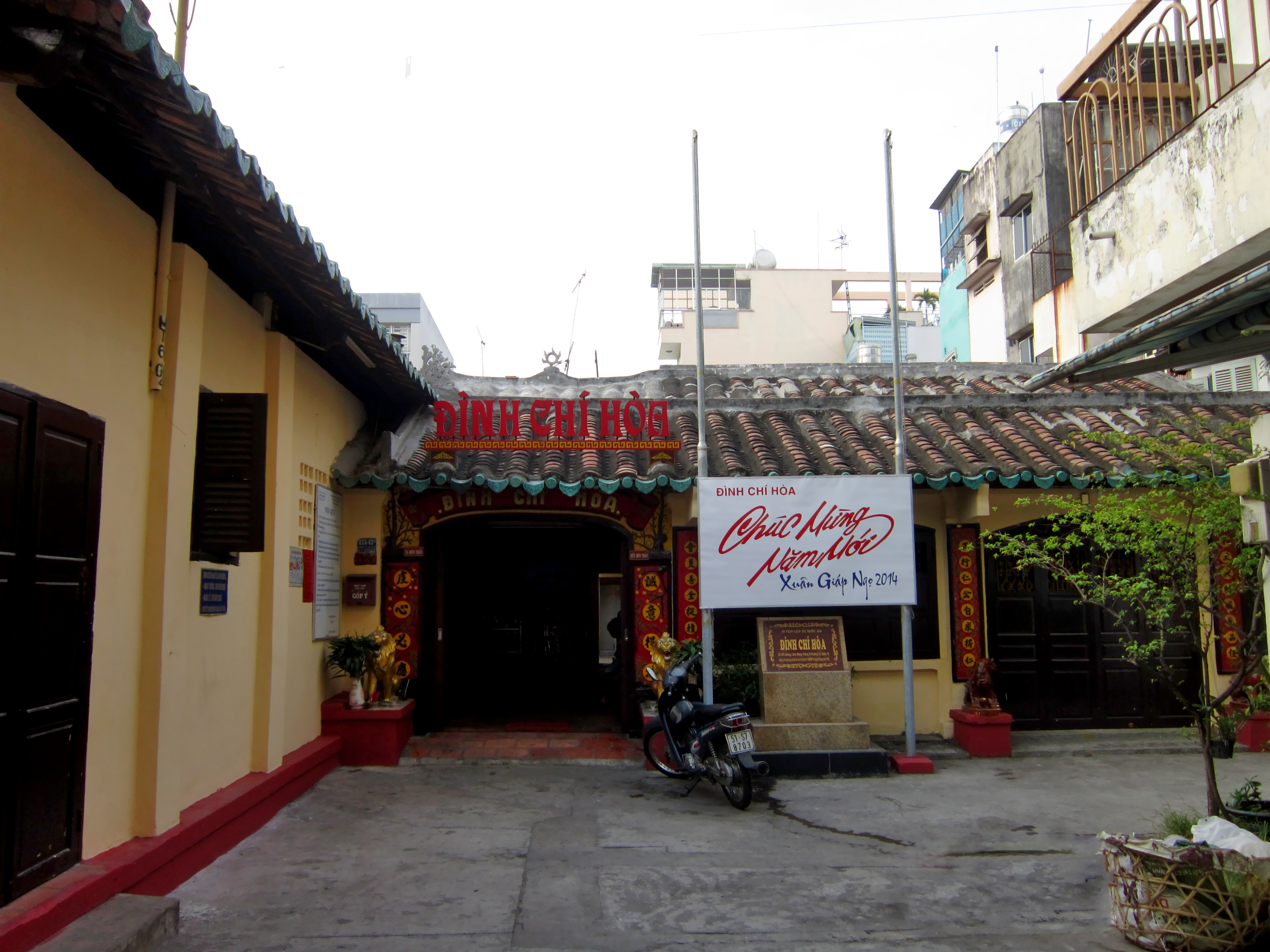
- From top to bottom, left to right: Workers' Statue at Ngã Bảy Roundabout, Thống Nhất Stadium, Hòa Bình Theatre, Chí Hòa Prison, Viettel Complex, and Chí Hòa Temple

- Seal

- Location in Ho Chi Minh City, prior to 2025 administrative reforms

- Location within Vietnam
- Coordinates: 10°46′25″N 106°40′2″E
- Country: Vietnam
- Centrally governed city: Ho Chi Minh City
- Established: 1 July 1969
- Dissolved: 1 July 2025
- Seat: 474 Ba Tháng Hai
- Wards (phường): 11 wards

Area
  - Total: 5.7181 km^{2} (2.2078 sq mi)
- Elevation: 2 m (6.6 ft)

Population (2018)
  - Total: 399,000
  - Density: 69,800/km^{2} (181,000/sq mi)

Demographics
  - Ethnic groups: majority Kinh, Hoa,...
- Time zone: UTC+07 (ICT)
- Website: quan10.gov.vn

District 10 (Vietnamese: Quận 10) was an urban district (quận) of Ho Chi Minh City, the largest city in Vietnam.

As of 2017, the district had a population of 239,053 and an area of 5.7181 km^{2}, occupying 0.24% of the city's total land area. Prior to its dissolution in 2025, the city was divided into 11 wards (phường), numbered from Ward 1 to Ward 15 (with the exception of 3, 5, 7, and 11).

District 10 bordered Tân Bình District to the north, District 5 to the south, District 3 to the east, and District 11 to the west.

== History ==
=== Early history ===
Prior to its official establishment, District 10 was a 'desolate, empty area' situated between the quarters of Sài Gòn & Chợ Lớn. Afterwards, its strategic location prompted a large number of settlers. During the reign of emperor Minh Mạng, Lê Văn Khôi (adopted son of Lê Văn Duyệt) prominently led the district's residents in a failed uprising against the imperial dynasty.

Minh Mạng then ordered a crackdown on the uprising, and for the dead to be buried in mass graves scattered across the area "extending from Bình Dân Hospital to Việt Nam Quốc Tự", otherwise known as modern-day District 10. As a result, the area first came to be known as 'Mả Ngụy' (lit. 'traitors' grave'). As time went by, the area was eventually referred to as Đồng Mả Lạng (lit. 'hilly field of graves'). Similarly, the region's high concentration of graves gave it the nickname "land of graves" (Plaise des tombean) by French colonizers.

The French, who'd established modern-day District 10 as part of Chợ Lớn province in 1899, initially used the land for grazing horses — but felt it was unfavorable due to being too barren and dry to grow horse feed, such as grass.

By 1945, the area was met with a large, concentrated wave of immigrants from Southern & Central Vietnam.

=== South Vietnamese era (1969 - 1975) ===
On the 1 July 1969, District 10 of Saigon was officially established from the areas split between what was then District 5 and District 3. The district originally consisted of 4 wards: Minh Mạng, Nguyễn Tri Phương, Phan Thanh Giản, and Chí Hòa. By 1972 came the establishment of the 5th ward: Nhật Tảo ward.

District 10 would maintain the same number of wards until the 29th of April, 1975, immediately prior to the Fall of Saigon.

=== Modern era (1976 - 2025) ===
On the 20th of May, 1976, as part of a second series of administrative reforms within Saigon (now renamed Sài Gòn-Gia Định under the Provisional Revolutionary Government of the Republic of South Vietnam, and eventually Hồ Chí Minh City), it was decided, under Resolution 301/UB of the People's Committee, that District 10 itself would maintain its official status.

This was proceeded by the abolition of the 5 former wards in favor of the establishment of 25 new wards, numbered from '1' to '25'.

On the 17th of February, 1979, wards 10, 13, and 18 were abolished under Resolution 52-CP of the Council of Government, reducing the number of wards to 22.

On the 12th of September, 1981, wards 4, 17, and 22 were abolished under Resolution 67-HĐBT of the Council of Ministers, further reducing the number of wards to 19.

On the 14th of February, 1987, under Resolution 33-HĐBT, the following changes were made:

- The renaming of wards 1, 15, 16, 11, 12, 14, 21, and 20 to wards 3, 5, 6, 8, 10, 11, 12, and 14, respectively
- The merging of the former wards 2 & 3 to form "Ward 2".
- The merging of the former Ward 9 with a portion of the former Ward 8 to form "Ward 4".
- The merging of the former Ward 7 with the remaining portion of the former Ward 8 to form "Ward 9".
- The merging of the former Ward 24 with a portion of the former Ward 23 to form "Ward 13".
- The merging of the former Ward 25 with the remaining portion of the former Ward 23 to form "Ward 15".

On the 9th of December, 2020, under the Standing Committee of the National Assembly of Vietnam enacted Resolution No. 1111/NQ-UBTVQH14 (set to go into effect on the 1 January 2021), Ward 3 was officially merged into Ward 2.

On the 14th of November, 2024, the Standing Committee once again enacted Resolution No. 1278/NQ-UBTVQH15 (which went into effect on the 1 January 2025), including the following changes:

- The merging of Ward 7 into Ward 6.
- The merging of Ward 5 into Ward 8.
- The merging of Ward 11 into Ward 10.

On the 16th of June, 2025, (as part of the 2025 Vietnamese administrative reforms) the Standing Committee enacted Resolution No. 1685/NQ-UBTVQH15, aimed at rearranging the subdivisions of Hồ Chí Minh, which included the following changes:

- (The dissolution of all urban districts, including District 10)
- The merging of wards 6, 8, and a portion of Ward 14 to form "Diên Hồng ward".
- The merging of wards 1, 2, 4, 9, and 10 to form "Vườn Lài ward".
- The merging of wards 12, 13, 15, and the remainder of Ward 14 to form "Hòa Hưng ward".

== Administrative divisions ==
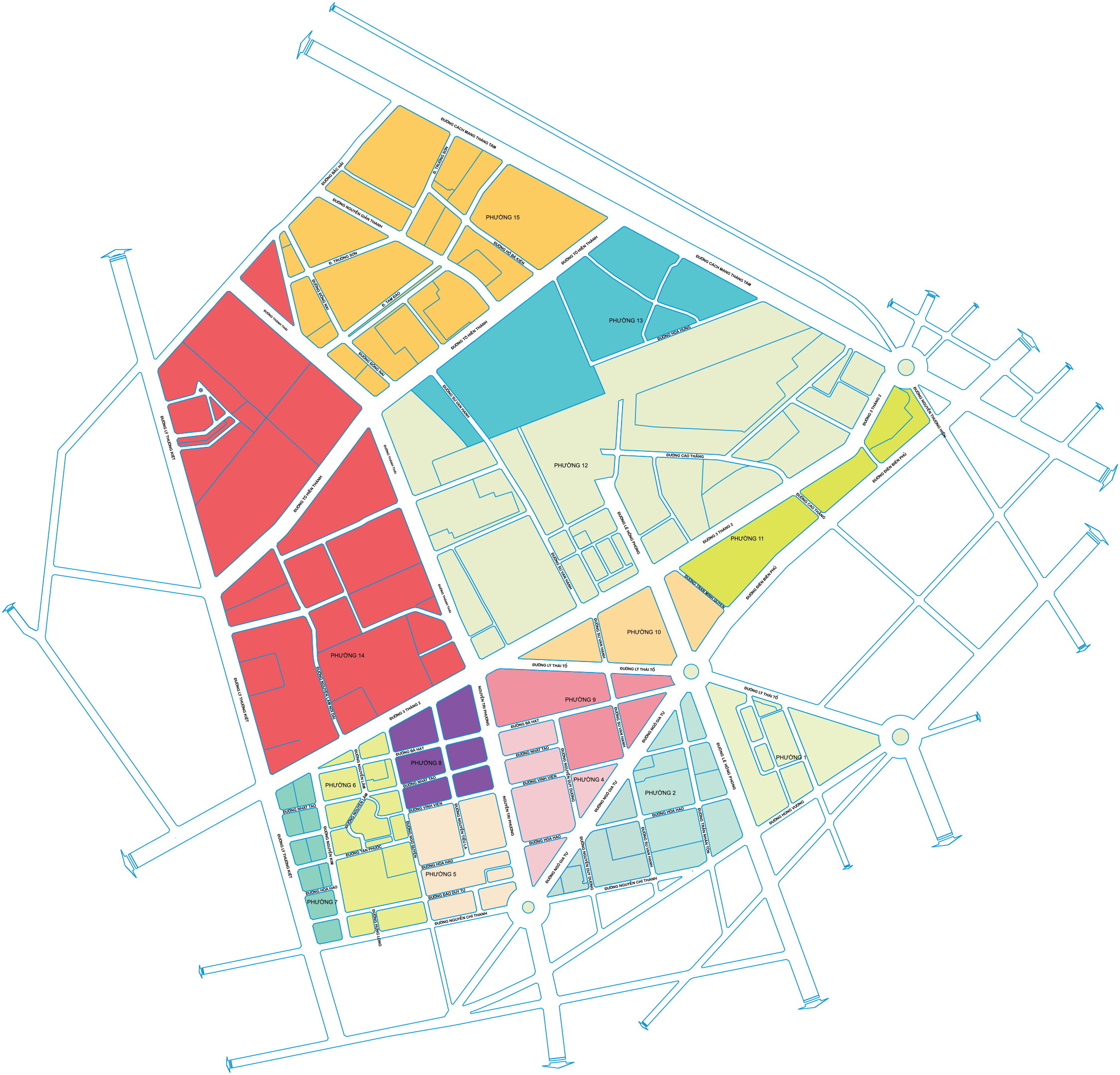
Administrative map of District 10

Prior to its dissolution, District 10 had eleven wards: 1, 2, 4, 6, 8, 9, 10, 12, 13, 14, and 15.

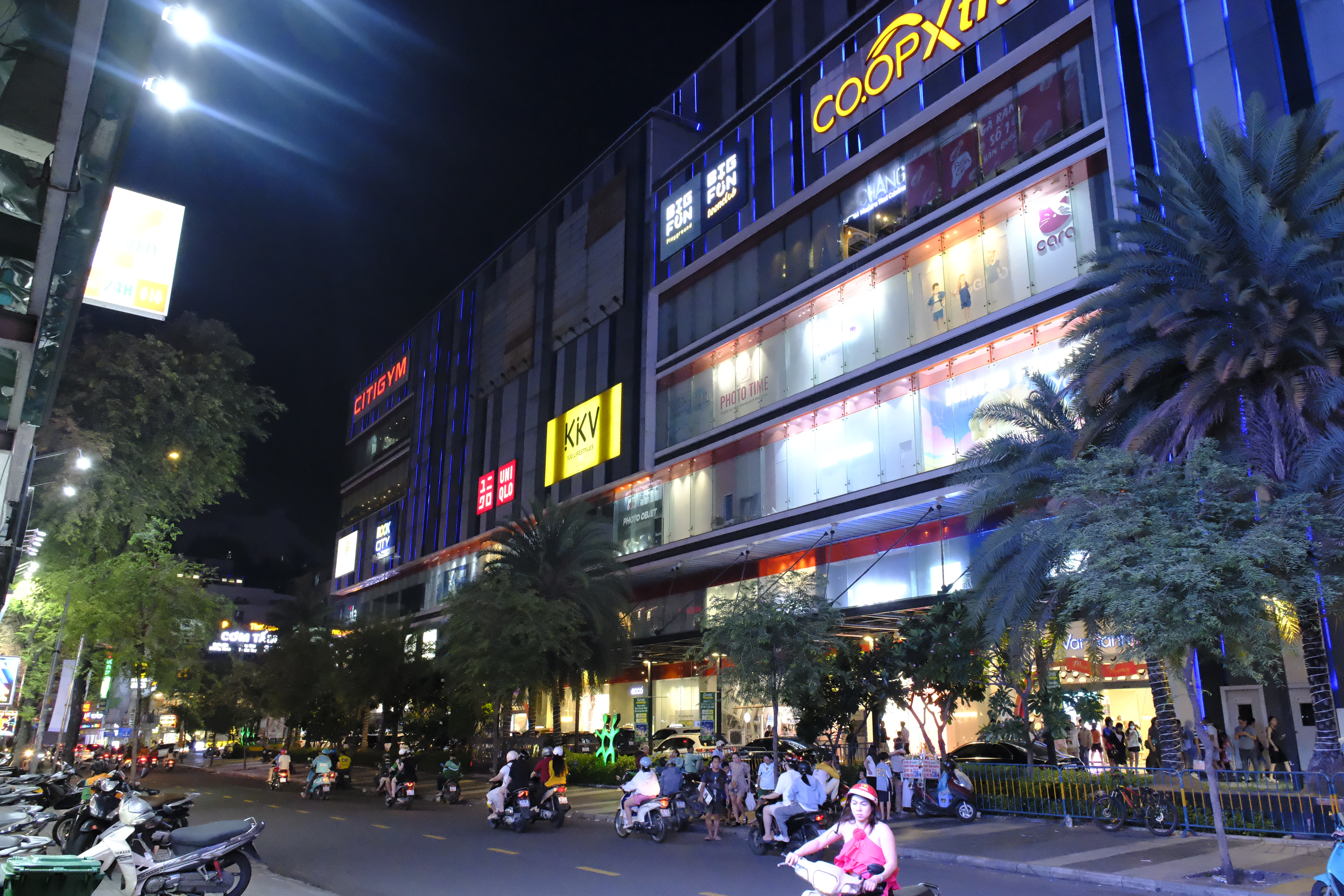
Vạn Hạnh Mall

== Economy ==
Economically, District 10 was one of Hồ Chí Minh City's central districts and major commercial hubs. The district's trade and service sector has experienced rapid growth, and — with many diverse, high-end commercial services — has helped District 10 with attracting investment from businesses.

Moreover, commercial value made up much of District 10's economy, with state-owned commercial enterprises making up roughly 60-80% of local economic output. The total investment capital from private enterprises as well as companies in the area reached nearly 700 billion VND.

Annual growth rates in the industrial and handicraft sectors exceeded the planned target of 14.58%, with the average growth rate being 16.94% for state-owned economic sectors and 13.67% for non-state owned. The average growth rate of trade-in-services reached approximately 16.98%, while limited liability companies and private enterprises both made up a majority of the district's total annual revenue.

Exports consist primarily of electronics, cosmetics, textiles, agriculture, and processed rubber. Conversely, imports consist of raw manufacturing materials.

== Culture ==
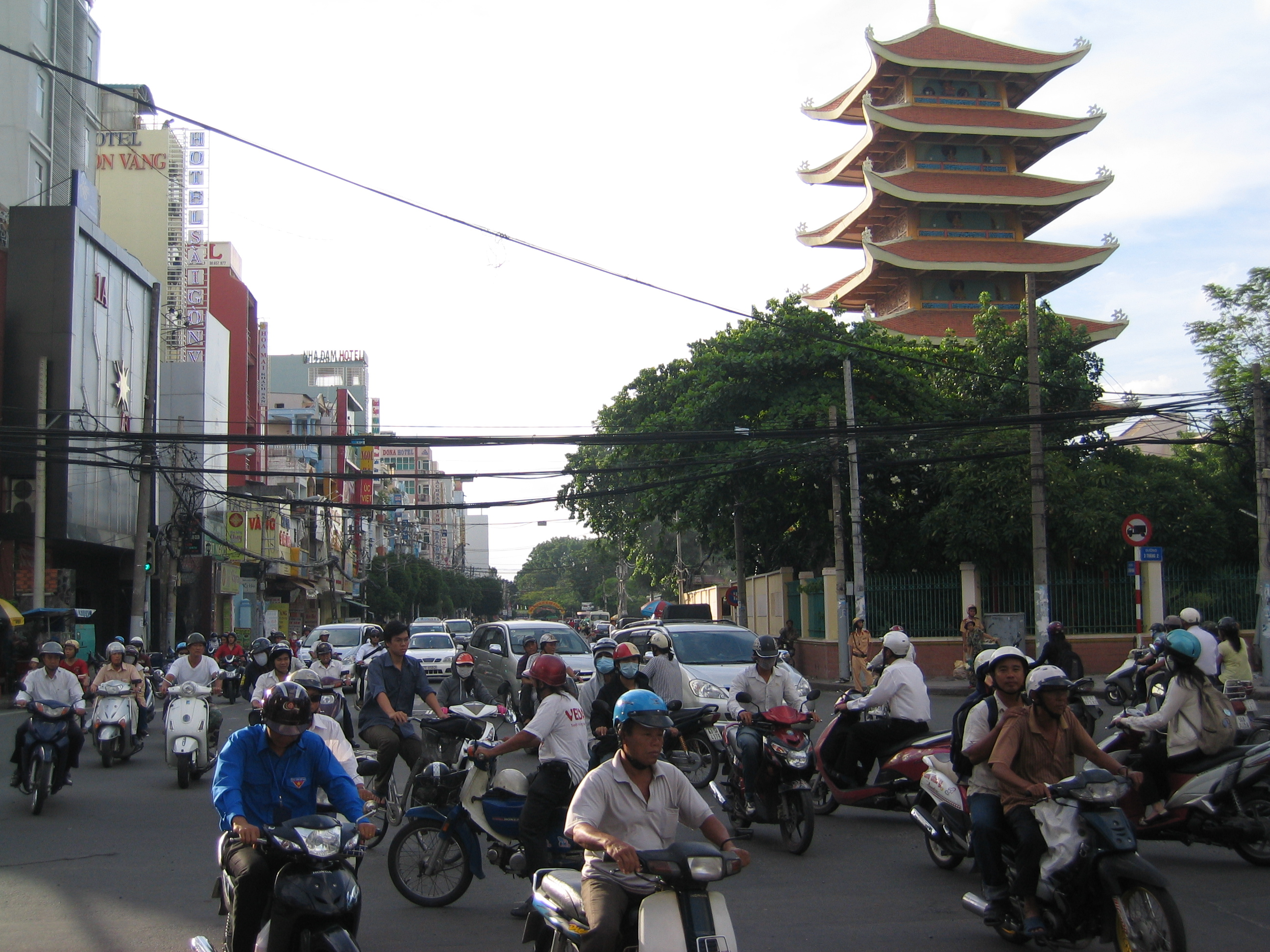
Việt Nam Quốc Tự, as viewed from Lê Hồng Phong Street

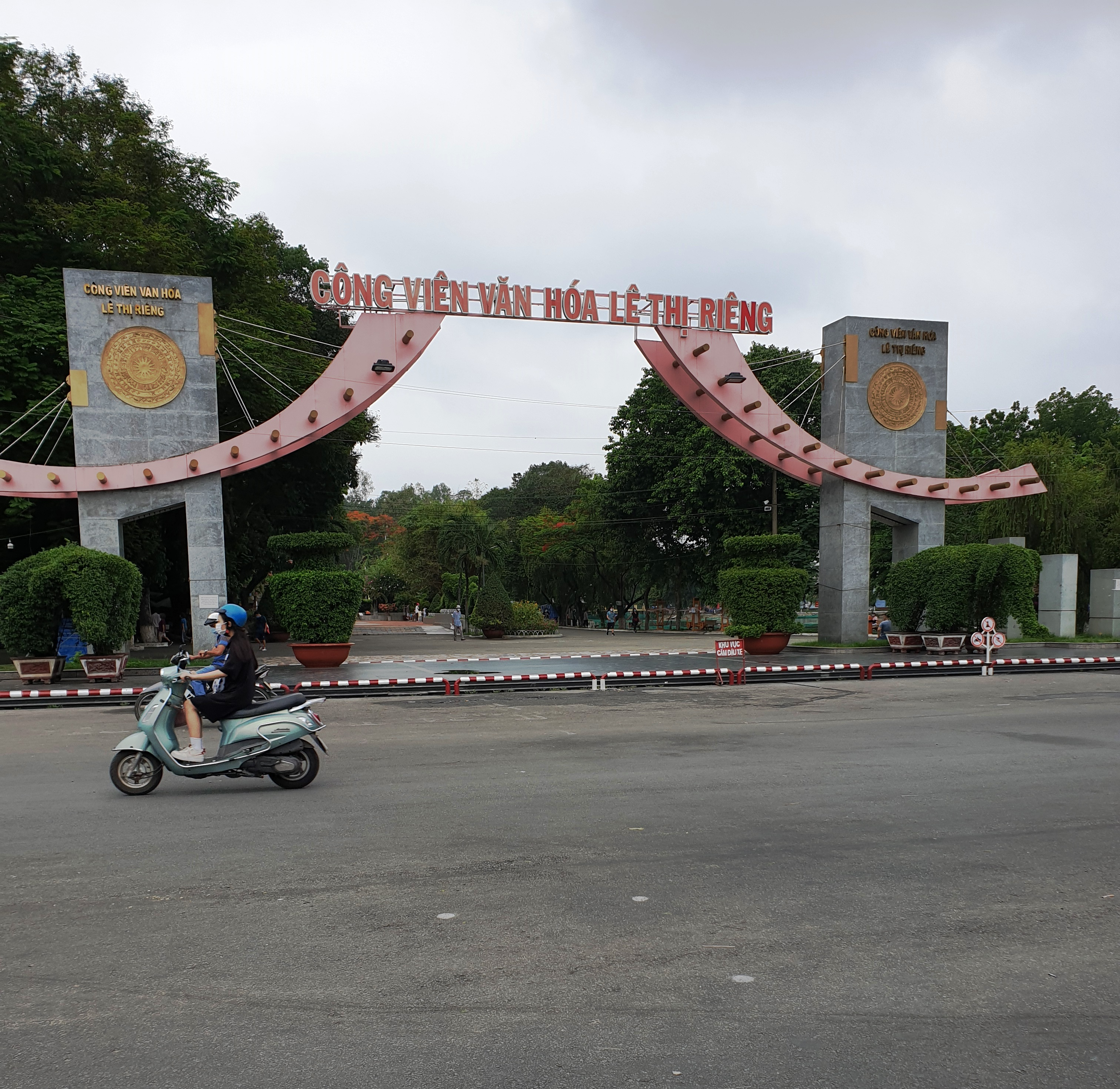
2nd gate of Lê Thị Riêng Cultural Park, facing Cách Mạng Tháng Tám Street

=== Famous landmarks ===
Name	Address	Notes
Museum of Traditional Vietnamese Medicine (Fito Museum)	41 Hoàng Dư Khương, Ward 12	
Ấn Quang Pagoda	243 Sư Vạn Hạnh, Ward 9	Pagoda
Bửu Đà Pagoda	419/11 Cách Mạng Tháng Tám, Ward 13	Pagoda
Hưng Long Pagoda	298 Ngô Gia Tự, Ward 4	Pagoda
Trần Quốc Pagoda	252 Ngô Gia Tự, Ward 4	Pagoda
Từ Nghiêm Pagoda	415–417 Bà Hạt, Ward 4	Pagoda
Việt Nam Quốc Tự	244 Ba Tháng Hai, Ward 12	Pagoda
"Bunker B"	122/8 Ngô Gia Tự, Ward 9	
Lê Thị Riêng Cultural Park (White Rabbit Amusement Park)	875 Cách Mạng Tháng Tám, Ward 15	
"Historic secret weapons bunker"	183/4 Ba Tháng Hai, Ward 10	
Hòa Bình Theatre (lit. 'Peace Theatre')	240 Ba Tháng Hai, Ward 12	
Thống Nhất Stadium	138 Đào Duy Từ, Ward 6	
Thống Nhất Stadium	30 Nguyễn Kim, Ward 6	Gate A

== Healthcare ==
The "District 10 Health Street" (Phố sức khỏe Quận 10) is an officially-designated, 2,800 meter-long "health street", spanning across the entire segment of Sư Vạn Hạnh St. from the intersection at Ba Tháng Hai Street to the one at Tô Hiến Thành Street.

The health street came about in mid-2023 alongside other projects made by the People's Committee of District 10 (prior to 2025 reforms), aimed at "the development of medical tourism and the ways of combining it with other local services such as entertainment, shopping, and tourist accommodations". With it, three local "medical tourist products" were developed in District 10, each titled: "Q.10 - Ngày tỏa nắng (lit. 'District 10 - A shiny day')", "Q.10 - Tỏa sáng nụ cười (lit. 'District 10 - Make your smile shine')", and "Em là bác sĩ (lit. 'I am a doctor')".

=== Healthcare facilities ===
District 10 consisted of the following hospitals:

Name of hospital	Addresss
Post Office General Hospital (Bệnh viện Đa khoa Bưu điện)	Lô B9 Thành Thái, Ward 15
Sài Gòn Ngô Gia Tự Eye Hospital (Bệnh viện Mắt Sài Gòn Ngô Gia Tự)	355–356 Ngô Gia Tự, Ward 3
People's Hospital 115 (Bệnh viện Nhân dân 115)	527 Sư Vạn Hạnh, Ward 12
Children's Hospital 1 (Bệnh viện Nhi đồng 1)	341 Sư Vạn Hạnh, Ward 10
District 10 Hospital (Bệnh viện Quận 10)	571 Sư Vạn Hạnh, Ward 1
STO Oriental Hospital (Bệnh viện STO Phương Đông)	79 Thành Thái, Ward 14
Trưng Vương Hospital (Bệnh viện Trưng Vương)	266 Lý Thường Kiệt, Ward 14
Vạn Hạnh Hospital (Bệnh viện Vạn Hạnh)	781/B1-B3-B5 Lê Hồng Phong, Ward 12
Vạn Hạnh Hospital (Bệnh viện Vạn Hạnh)	72–74 Sư Vạn Hạnh, Ward 12

== Education ==
Prior to the 2025 reforms & merger, education in District 10 was managed by the Board of Education and Training of District 10; a government body administered by the district's People's Committee.

=== Higher education ===
==== Universities ====
Name of institution	Address	Website	Notes
Ho Chi Minh City University of Economics (Đại học Kinh tế Thành phố Hồ Chí Minh)	279 Nguyễn Tri Phương, Ward 8		Campus B
Ho Chi Minh City University of Economics (Đại học Kinh tế Thành phố Hồ Chí Minh)	91 Ba Tháng Hai, Ward 10		Campus C
Vietnam Military Medical University - Southern Branch (Phân hiệu phía Nam Học viện Quân y)	84 Thành Thái, Ward 12		
Academy of Public Administration and Governance - Ho Chi Minh City Campus (Phân hiệu Học viện Hành chính Quốc gia tại Thành phố Hồ Chí Minh)	10 Ba Tháng Hai, Ward 12		
Ho Chi Minh City University of Technology (Trường Đại học Bách khoa - Đại học Quốc gia Thành phó Hồ Chí Minh)	268 Lý Thường Kiệt, 14		
Ho Chi Minh City University of Foreign Languages - Information Technology (Trường Đại học Ngoại ngữ – Tin học Thành phố Hồ Chí Minh)	828 Sư Vạn Hạnh, Ward 13		Main campus
Ho Chi Minh City University of Foreign Languages - Information Technology (Trường Đại học Ngoại ngữ – Tin học Thành phố Hồ Chí Minh)	M4–M7–M9 Thất Sơn, Ward 15		
Ho Chi Minh City University of Foreign Languages - Information Technology (Trường Đại học Ngoại ngữ – Tin học Thành phố Hồ Chí Minh)	298–304 Cao Thắng, Ward 12		
Pham Ngoc Thach University of Medicine (Trường Đại học Y khoa Phạm Ngọc Thạch)	2 Dương Quang Trung, Ward 12		

==== Colleges ====
Name of institution	Địa chỉ	Website
Ho Chi Minh City College of Economics (Trường Cao đẳng Kinh tế Thành phố Hồ Chí Minh)	33 Vĩnh Viễn, Ward 2	

=== High schools (Trung học phổ thông / THPT), inter-level schools offering high school education ===
Name of institution	Address	Website	Notes
Diên Hồng Secondary & High School (Trường THCS và THPT Diên Hồng)	11 Thành Thái, Ward 14		Public school
Sương Nguyệt Ánh Secondary & High School (Trường THCS và THPT Sương Nguyệt Ánh)	249 Hòa Hảo, Ward 3		Public school
Nguyễn An Ninh High School (Trường THPT Nguyễn An Ninh)	93 Trần Nhân Tôn, Ward 2		Public school
Nguyễn Du High School (Trường THPT Nguyễn Du)	XX1 Đồng Nai, Bắc Hải Housing Estate, Ward 15		Public school
Nguyễn Khuyến High School (Trường THPT Nguyễn Khuyến)	50 Thành Thái, Ward 12		Public school
Duy Tân Secondary & High School (Trường THCS và THPT Duy Tân)	106 Nguyễn Giản Thanh, Ward 15		Private school
Vạn Hạnh Primary, Secondary & High School (Trường Tiểu học - THCS - THPT Vạn Hạnh)	781E Lê Hồng Phong, Ward 12		Private school

=== Secondary schools (Trung học cơ sở / THCS) ===
The following list does not include inter-level schools offering high school education.

Name of institution	Address	Note
Cách Mạng Tháng Tám Secondary School (Trường THCS Cách Mạng Tháng Tám)	289 Cách Mạng Tháng Tám, Ward 12	
Hòa Hưng Secondary School (Trường THCS Hòa Hưng)	493/73A Cách Mạng Tháng Tám, Ward 13	
Hoàng Văn Thụ Secondary School (Trường THCS Hoàng Văn Thụ)	322 Nguyễn Tri Phương, Ward 4	
Lạc Hồng Secondary School (Trường THCS Lạc Hồng)	436/4 Ba Tháng Hai, Ward 12	
Lạc Hồng Secondary School (Trường THCS Lạc Hồng)	436B/34 Ba Tháng Hai, Ward 12	Campus 2
Nguyễn Tri Phương Secondary School (Trường THCS Nguyễn Tri Phương)	26 Nguyễn Lâm, Ward 6	Gate A
Nguyễn Tri Phương Secondary School (Trường THCS Nguyễn Tri Phương)	42A Nguyễn Lâm, Ward 6	Gate B
Nguyễn Văn Tố Secondary School (Trường THCS Nguyễn Văn Tố)	140 Tam Đảo, Ward 14	
Trần Phú Secondary School (Trường THCS Trần Phú)	82 Cửu Long, Ward 15	

=== Primary schools (Trường tiểu học) ===
Name of institution	Address
Bắc Hải Primary School (Trường Tiểu học Bắc Hải)	103–105 Bắc Hải, Ward 15
Dương Minh Châu Primary School (Trường Tiểu học Dương Minh Châu)	34 Nguyễn Lâm, Ward 6
Điện Biên Primary School (Trường Tiểu học Điện Biên)	378/5 Điện Biên Phủ, Ward 11
Hoàng Diệu Primary School (Trường Tiểu học Hoàng Diệu)	283/44 Cách Mạng Tháng Tám, Ward 12
Hồ Thị Kỷ Primary School (Trường Tiểu học Hồ Thị Kỷ)	105 Hồ Thị Kỷ, Ward 1
Lê Đình Chinh Primary School (Trường Tiểu học Lê Đình Chinh)	7/4 Thành Thái, Ward 14
Lê Thị Riêng Primary School (Trường Tiểu học Lê Thị Riêng)	493 Cách Mạng Tháng Tám, Ward 13
Nguyễn Chí Thanh Primary School (Trường Tiểu học Nguyễn Chí Thanh)	302 Nguyễn Chí Thanh, Ward 8
Nhật Tảo Primary School (Trường Tiểu học Nhật Tảo)	1 Nhật Tảo, Ward 9
Thiên Hộ Dương Primary School (Trường Tiểu học Thiên Hộ Dương)	341 Tô Hiến Thành, Ward 12
Tô Hiến Thành Primary School (Trường Tiểu học Tô Hiến Thành)	104 Tô Hiến Thành, Ward 15
Trần Nhân Tôn Primary School (Trường Tiểu học Trần Nhân Tôn)	247 Hòa Hảo, Ward 2
Trần Quang Cơ Primary School (Trường Tiểu học Trần Quang Cơ)	438 Ngô Gia Tự, Ward 4
Trần Văn Kiểu Primary School (Trường Tiểu học Trần Văn Kiểu)	479 Vĩnh Viễn, Ward 6
Triệu Thị Trinh Primary School (Trường Tiểu học Triệu Thị Trinh)	91/8D Hòa Hưng, Ward 12
Trương Định Primary School (Trường Tiểu học Trương Định)	382 Sư Vạn Hạnh, Ward 2
Võ Trường Toản Primary School (Trường Tiểu học Võ Trường Toản)	354/74 Lý Thường Kiệt, Ward 14
