= Hòa Bình Theater =

- Nhà hát Hòa Bình
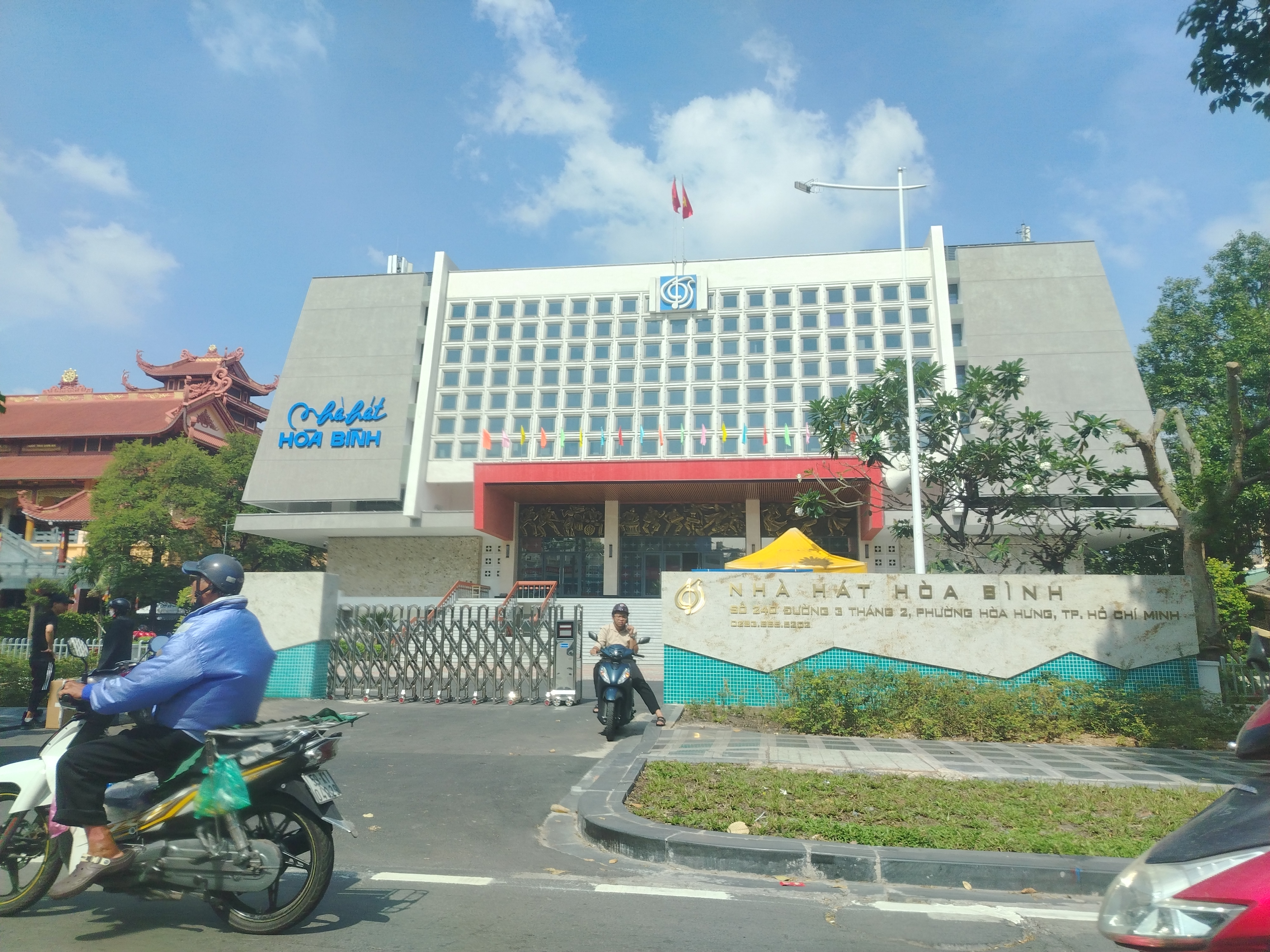
- Façade of Hòa Bình Theater
- Interactive map of the Hòa Bình Theater area
- Alternative names: Peace Theater

General information
- Status: Completed
- Type: Theater, cinema
- Architectural style: Vietnamese Modernist
- Location: 240 Ba Tháng Hai Blvd., Hòa Hưng, Ho Chi Minh City, Vietnam
- Coordinates: 10°46′20″N 106°40′25″E
- Year built: 2
- Groundbreaking: 1983
- Inaugurated: April 26, 1985; 41 years ago
- Renovated: 2005; 2025

Technical details
- Floor area: 16,500 square metres (178,000 sq ft)

Design and construction
- Architects: Huỳnh Tấn Phát, Nguyễn Thành Thế

Other information
- Seating capacity: 2500 (1985); 2035 (2005)

Website
- nhahathoabinh.com.vn

Hòa Bình Theater (Vietnamese: Nhà hát Hòa Bình; lit. 'Peace Theater') is a theater located in Hòa Hưng ward, Ho Chi Minh City, Vietnam.

Constructed on a section of land originally split from the Việt Nam Quốc Tự, the theater was designed and constructed under the assistance of then Deputy Prime Minister of Vietnam, Huỳnh Tấn Phát & architect Nguyễn Thành Thế in 1983.

In addition to hosting variety music shows, the theater has also held national-level art performances and cultural events. The theatre showcases a plethora of films from 4 PM daily (excluding on performance nights), during which its large concert hall would momentarily be repurposed as a makeshift movie theater.

In the face of numerous difficulties, the then chairman of the People's Committee of District 10 made the decision to build a theater to serve the spiritual life of the district's residents; it was planned to be a small-scale theater, modeled after the Hóc Môn district Theater. But then, they decided to build a more impressive theater to serve the people of the city, with financial contributions from businesses and the people of the district themselves. The building was inaugurated and put into operation on April 26, 1985. After seating was installed in 2005, the theater had a capacity of 2,035 people. The theater latest major renovation was from late 2024, it was completed in 2025.

== Notable events ==
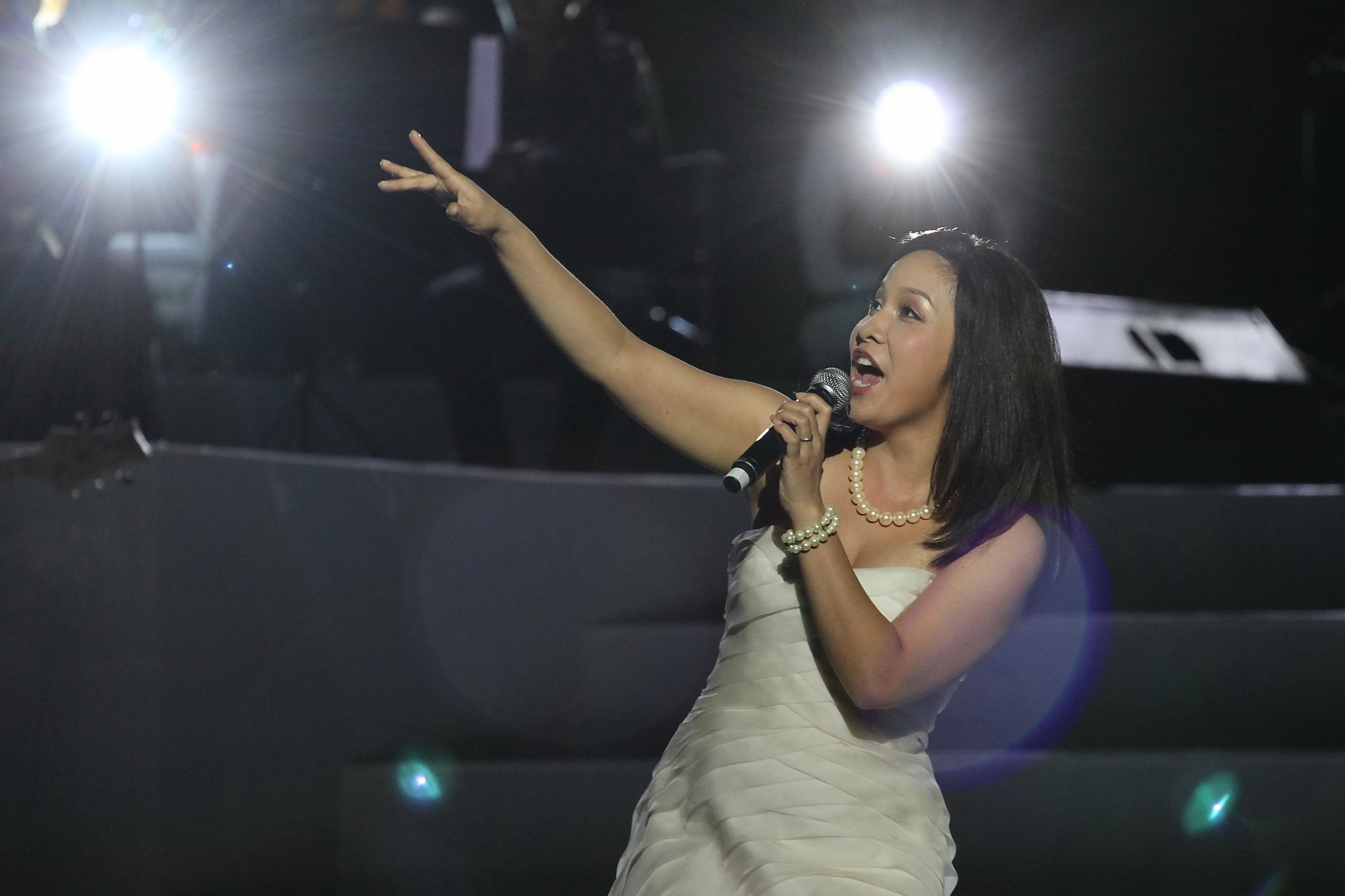
Mỹ Linh performs during liveshow Mỗi ngày tôi chọn một niềm vui, 2012

The Hòa Bình Theater has hosted numerous domestic and international entertainment events over the years. It is the venue for music award ceremonies, such as the annual Làn Sóng Xanh Music Awards.

In 2006, Vietnamese singer Quang Dung held his first live show ever in his career, titled Chuyện của tôi (lit. 'my story'), at the Hòa Bình Theater. In celebration of the 10th anniversary of his singing career, the actor would go on to host a liveshow titled "Love Story" in 2008.

In 2013, the sisters singer Cẩm Ly and Minh Tuyết held a concert there to celebrate their 20th anniversary in the music industry.

In 2017, the 2017 Mnet Asian Music Awards from South Korea was held at Hòa Bình Theater, featuring well-known artists from Vietnam and South Korea are Thu Minh, Tóc Tiên, Sơn Tùng M-TP, Seventeen, Wanna One and Samuel Kim.

Since 2018, the monthly music program "V Heartbeat Live" offered by V Live (a streaming service founded by Naver) has been held here. The program aims to connect Vietnamese and Korean popular music, bringing together many famous artists from both countries, including: Winner, Exid, Momoland, Mamamoo, Red Velvet, Super Junior, NU'EST, ITZY, Seventeen, I-dle,... The program has not been held since 2021 due to factors such as the COVID-19 pandemic.

In 2024, Park Bom, South Korean singer and member of girl group 2NE1, held her first solo concert in Vietnam by the name of "2024 Park Bom Special Fan Concert in Vietnam" at the Hòa Bình Theater.

In 2026, Phùng Khánh Linh held her first solo concert ever for her first concert tour, titled the Giữa Một Vạn Tour.

== Gallery ==
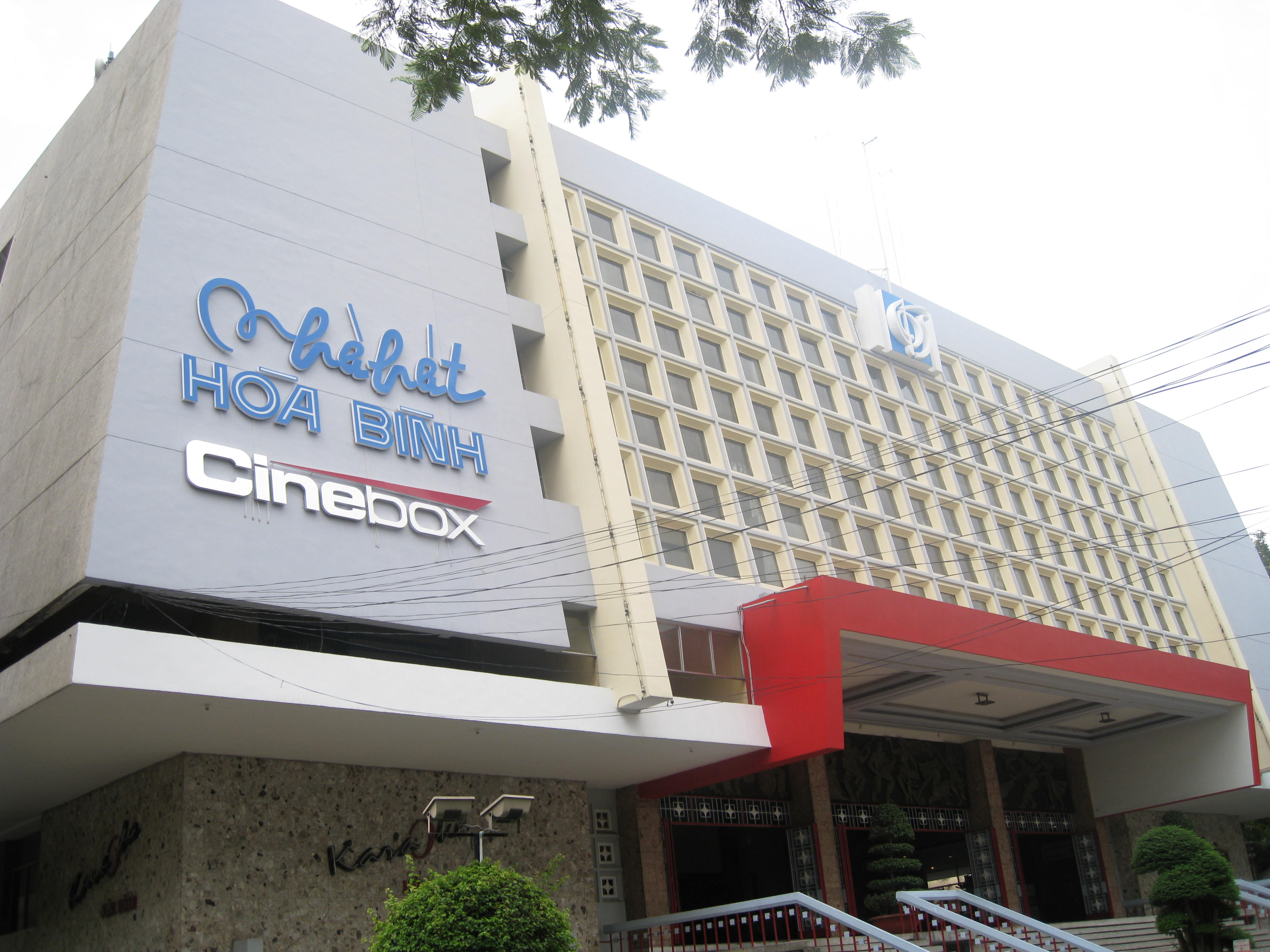
Hòa Bình Theater in 2009, with the Cinebox Cinema logo attached to its façade

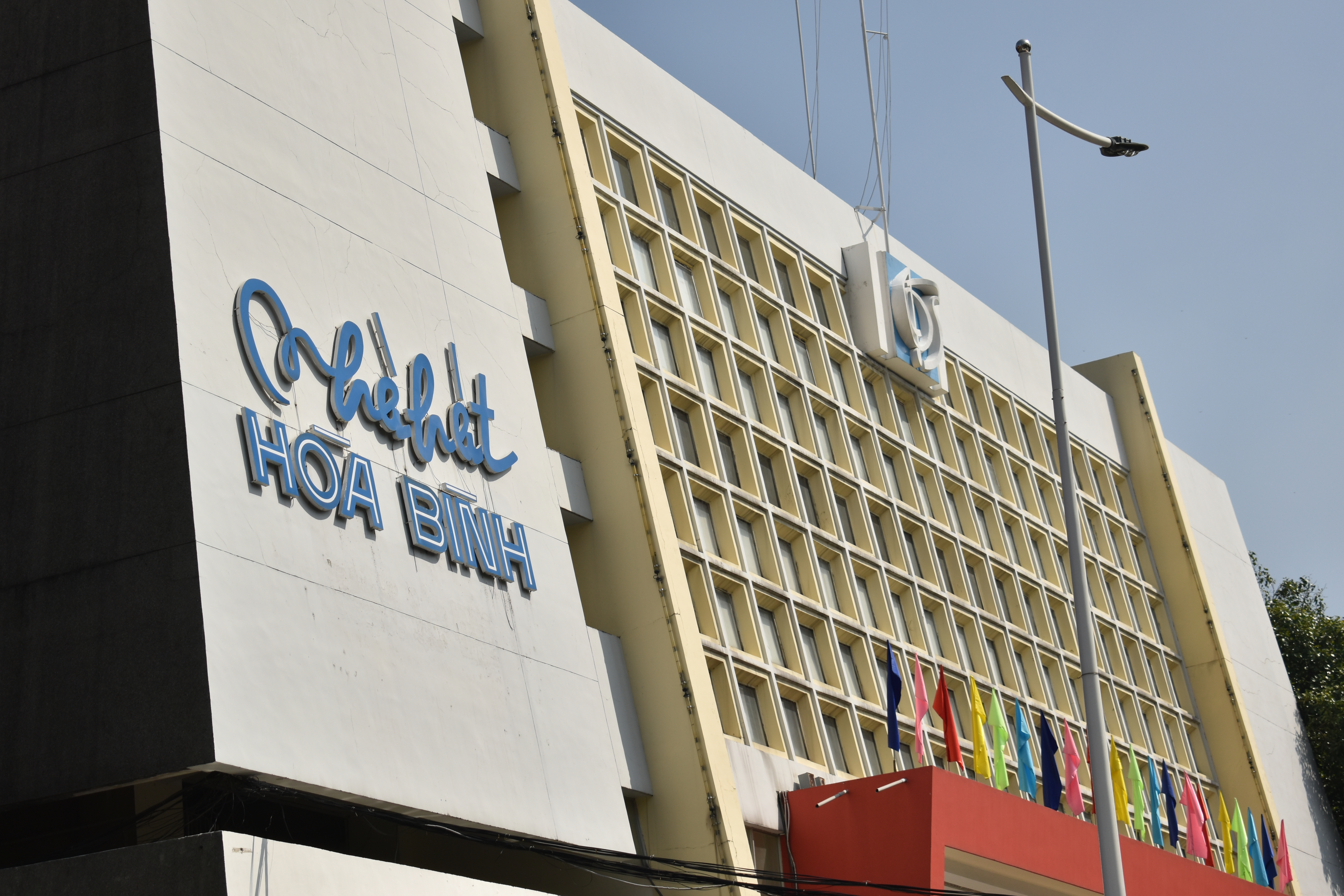
Hòa Bình Theater in 2019
