= Trần Phú Beach =

Urban beach in Nha Trang, Vietnam

Coordinates: 12.2502°N 109.1968°E

Trần Phú Beach is an urban beach in the central area of Nha Trang, Khánh Hòa province, Vietnam, running along Trần Phú Street. The beachfront is connected to a coastal park strip and is used for swimming and recreation in the city center. Trần Phú Beach is promoted as Nha Trang’s central swimming beach, with a long sandy strand and clear water.

Its reported length varies depending on how boundaries are defined: Vietnam Tourism estimates about 7 km, while VnExpress gives about 12 km for the “Trần Phú road beach”. The urban sandy shore on the western side of Nha Trang Bay is influenced by monsoon winds, wind-driven waves, and extreme weather events; studies in Nha Trang Bay have documented changes in beach morphology and the coastline over time.

== Location and extent ==
Trần Phú Beach lies on the eastern edge of Nha Trang’s central urban area, running parallel to Trần Phú Street and the adjacent coastal park strip. The area is on the western shore of Nha Trang Bay, a marine bay that is a member of the Les Plus Belles Baies du Monde ("The Most Beautiful Bays in the World") association.

The People's Committee of Nha Trang issued regulations for managing the “coastal park,” applying to the stretch from the Trần Hưng Đạo shrine area to the park opposite Mai Xuân Thưởng Street; the regulated area includes the seaside sidewalks along the Trần Phú–Phạm Văn Đồng corridor and the land from the sidewalk out to the waterline. The rules cover sightseeing, tourism, recreation, entertainment, and service business activities within the coastal park area.

== Landscape and use ==
Trần Phú Beach is a public bathing beach in central Nha Trang, directly adjacent to the urban waterfront and the coastal park strip. A promenade and landscaped green areas run along the shoreline within the coastal park. Sea-based recreational activities promoted in Nha Trang include scuba diving, surfing, and snorkeling.

== Natural conditions and shoreline change ==
=== Waves, tides, and geomorphic characteristics ===
The western shore of Nha Trang Bay lies within a semi-enclosed bay about 6 km long, oriented north–south, opening toward the South China Sea with limited fetch; an island group in the bay’s southeast corner shelters the western shoreline from southeasterly waves in summer, while winter monsoon conditions bring episodes of long, high-energy waves. Mean annual significant wave height is about 0.95 m with a mean peak period of 6.2 seconds; from October to April the averages are about 1.2 m and 6.8 seconds, and from May to September about 0.6 m and about 5 seconds.

Nha Trang Bay has a mixed tidal regime combining semi-diurnal and diurnal components, with a microtidal range of about 0.4–1.7 m. The monitored sandy beach is described as a “low tide terrace” type: the upper beach has an approximate slope of 0.1; the lower terrace has an approximate slope of 0.01; and terrace width varies by roughly 10–40 m alongshore.

=== Seasonal variability and scientific monitoring ===
Camera observations combined with in situ surveys indicate that the low-tide-terrace beach is stable on annual timescales, while also showing rapid sediment exchange between the terrace and the upper beach during storm or monsoon events; some tropical beaches show faster morphological recovery than beach profiles in mid-latitudes. Continuous shoreline camera monitoring is used to build time series of beach-profile change under constraints typical of traditional field measurement.

Analysis of shoreline change along the central beach on the western shore of Nha Trang Bay, using wave modeling and remote sensing imagery, has documented changes over time including coastal erosion and deposition along this coastline. Identifying the governing hydrodynamic regime and drivers of beach change has been framed as important given the beach’s urban setting and its link to tourism activities.
