= Hòa Hưng, Ho Chi Minh City =

Hòa Hưng Phường Hòa Hưng Chí Hòa, Kỳ Hòa
- Ward
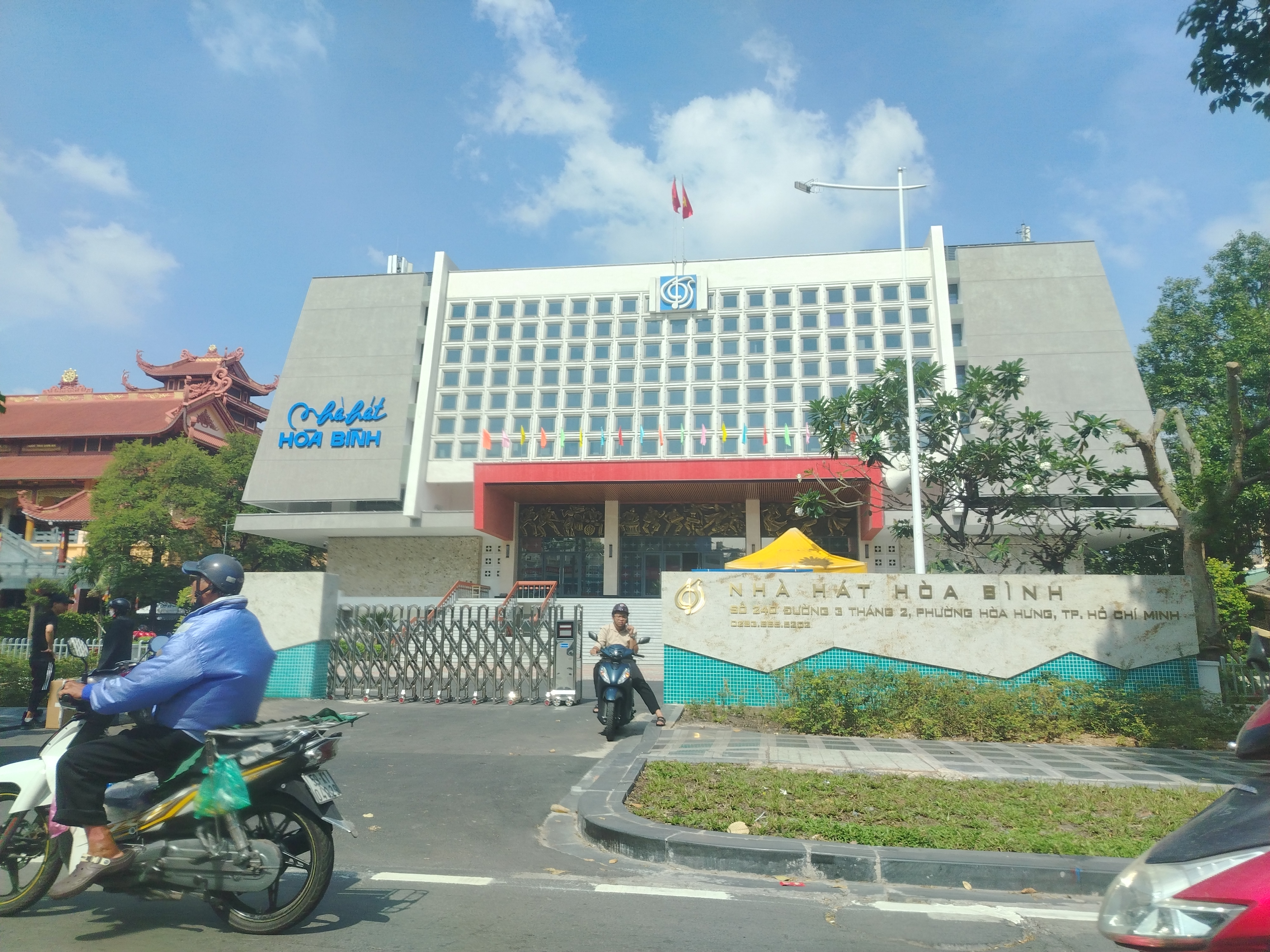
- Hòa Bình Theatre

- Seal

- Location in Ho Chi Minh City

- Location in Vietnam
- Coordinates: 10°46′28″N 106°40′18″E
- Country: Vietnam
- Municipality: Ho Chi Minh City
- Established: 1 July 2025
- People's Committee Headquarters: TT20 Tam Đảo St.

Government
  - Party Secretary: Nguyễn Thị Thu Hường
  - Leader of People's Committee: Lê Thị Ngọc Hiền
  - Leader of People's Council: Nguyễn Thị Thu Hường
  - Leader of Vietnam Fatherland Front Council: Trần Thanh Ngọc

Area
  - Total: 1.00 sq mi (2.59 km^{2})

Population (2024)
  - Total: 96,414
  - Density: 96.41/sq mi (37.225/km^{2})
- Time zone: UTC+07:00 (Indochina Time)
- Administrative code: 27163

Hòa Hưng (Vietnamese: Phường Hòa Hưng) is a ward of Ho Chi Minh City, Vietnam. It is one of the city's 168 new wards, communes and special zones following the 2025 Vietnamese administrative reforms, as stated under Resolution No. 1685/NQ-UBTVQH15 of the Standing Committee of the National Assembly of Vietnam.

== Etymology ==
The name "Hòa Hưng" has two origins, and is often used interchangeably with the historic name: "Chí Hòa".

Locally, the name "Hòa Hưng" originated from an old hamlet once part of the former Dương Hòa Thượng canton, Gia Định province. Back in 1818, "Hòa Hưng" also originally referred to a village of the same province, specifically Tân Hưng village – located in Bình Trị canton (which eventually came to be known as Bình Chánh Thượng canton), Bình Dương district, Gia Định.

Following administrative reforms in July of 2025, it was decided that the newly-formed ward would be named Hòa Hưng, due to the name's historical and cultural significance in the area.

The name Chí Hòa has multiple origins, one of which states the name originated from another, separate hamlet, spanning from Cha Cả Cemetery (in modern-day Tân Sơn Nhất and Tân Sơn Hòa) to the Dân Chủ Roundabout. During French rule, a homonymous village (Chí Hoà) was officially established following the merger of hamlets Hoà Hưng and Phú Thạnh in 1939. (Note: Both of which were part of the former Dương Hoà Thượng canton)

Historically, the name was used interchangeably with "Kỳ Hòa", which was reborrowed from the French term: "Ki-hoa"; a modification of the original name.

== History ==
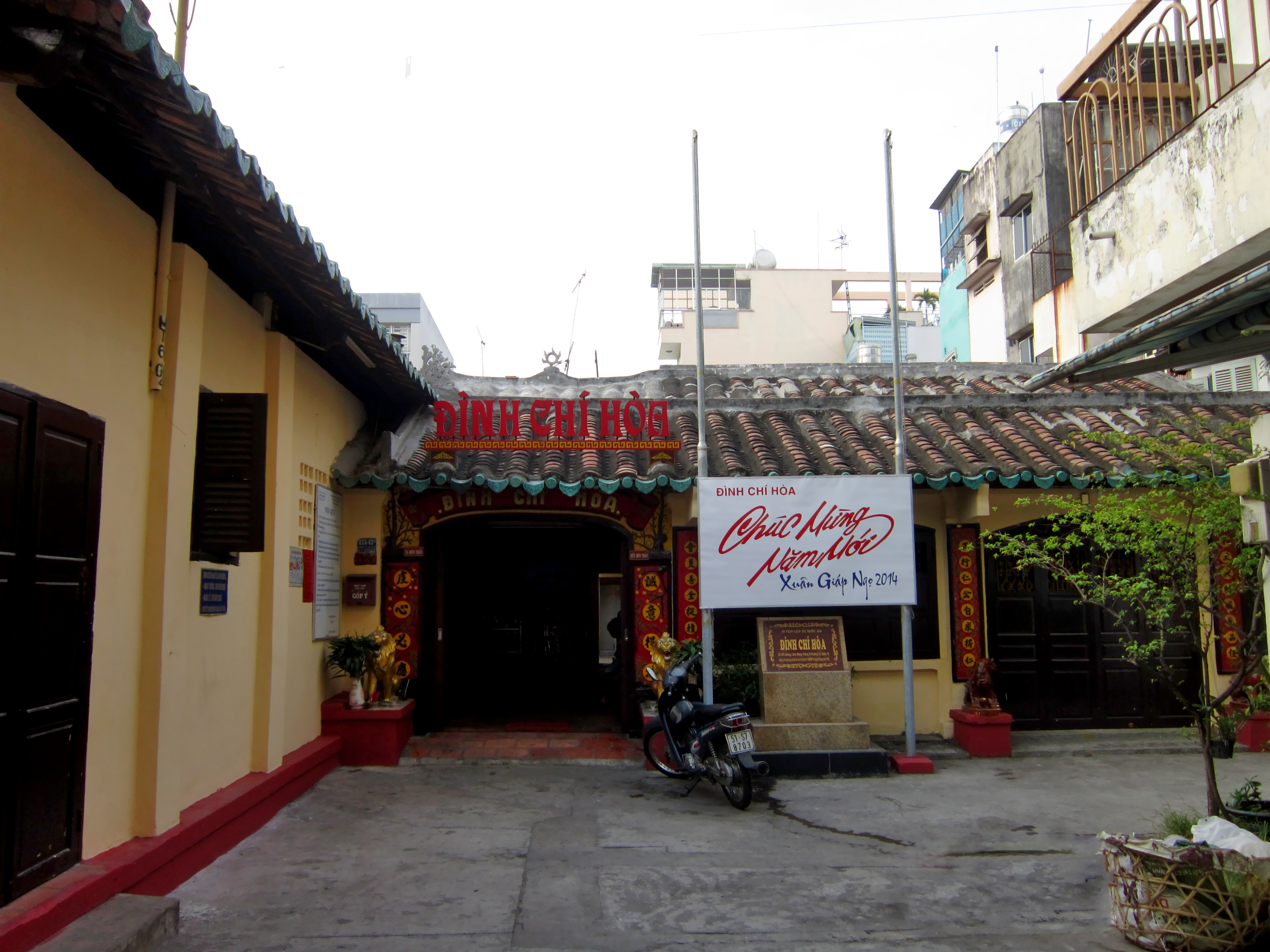
Đình Chí Hòa, a Vietnamese communal house which served as a village center, and at some point a school in the hamlet of Hòa Hưng.

=== Under French rule ===
In 1897, Hòa Hưng stood as one of the 14 hamlets (Note: Specifically: Bình Hưng Đông, Bình Hưng Thôn, Bình Thới, Phú Nhuận, Phú Thọ, Tân Hòa, Tân Hòa Tây, Tân Sơn Nhì, Tân Sơn Nhứt, Tân Thới, Tân Trụ, Thạnh Hòa, Hòa Hưng and Phú Thạnh.) which comprised the historic Dương Hòa Thượng commune, Gia Định province; it was said to have partly encompassed the territories of both modern-day Hòa Hưng and Diên Hồng ward.

By 1939, Hòa Hưng had merged with the neighboring hamlet of Phú Thạnh, its combined territories stretching from modern-day Bắc Hải to Nguyễn Thị Minh Khải Street, to form the village of Chí Hòa.

=== Prior to 1975 ===
During the onset of the Tet Offensive, an unorganized mass burial of hundreds of armymen, majority of whom were part of the National Liberation Front, had occurred on 12 February 1968 at the Chí Hòa - Chợ Quán Cemetery (modern-day Lê Thị Riêng Cultural Park). Excavation efforts, however, weren't underway until the 21st century.

The outline of modern-day Hòa Hưng ward closely resembles that of the former Chí Hòa ward of District 10, which had been established as part of District 10's four new wards in 1969 (prior to its dissolution in 1976).

=== Post-1975 ===
On 14 February 1987, under Resolution 33-HĐBT, various adjustments were made to District 10's constituent wards, three of which included:

- The renaming of Ward 21 and Ward 20 to form Ward 12 and Ward 14, respectively.
- The merging of the former Ward 24 with a portion of the former Ward 23 to form "Ward 13".
- The merging of the former Ward 25 with the remaining portion of the former Ward 23 to form "Ward 15".

On 16 June 2025, the National Assembly Standing Committee issued Resolution No. 1685/NQ-UBTVQH15 on the rearrangement of commune-level administrative units of Ho Chi Minh City in 2025. Under Article 1, Clause 27 (which was set to take effect on the 1st of July, 2025), the entirety of wards 12 & 13, along with a portion of Ward 14 in the former District 10, were merged to form the newly-established "Hòa Hưng ward".

In May 2026, the Ho Chi Minh City Military Command stated they had retrieved sufficient information from witness accounts on the mass burials which had taken place in 1968. Following efforts to verify and confirm the location of said burials, search efforts would officially commence on the 6th of July at the Lê Thị Riêng Cultural Park.

On 24 July, another burial site, located 100 meters from where excavations first took place, was discovered at the park. By 17 August, a total of 358 martyrs (of which 201 were buried alongside various relics discovered. By 22 August, that number had risen to 445. As of 25 September 2026, there has been a total of 665 discovered martyrs.

== Geography ==
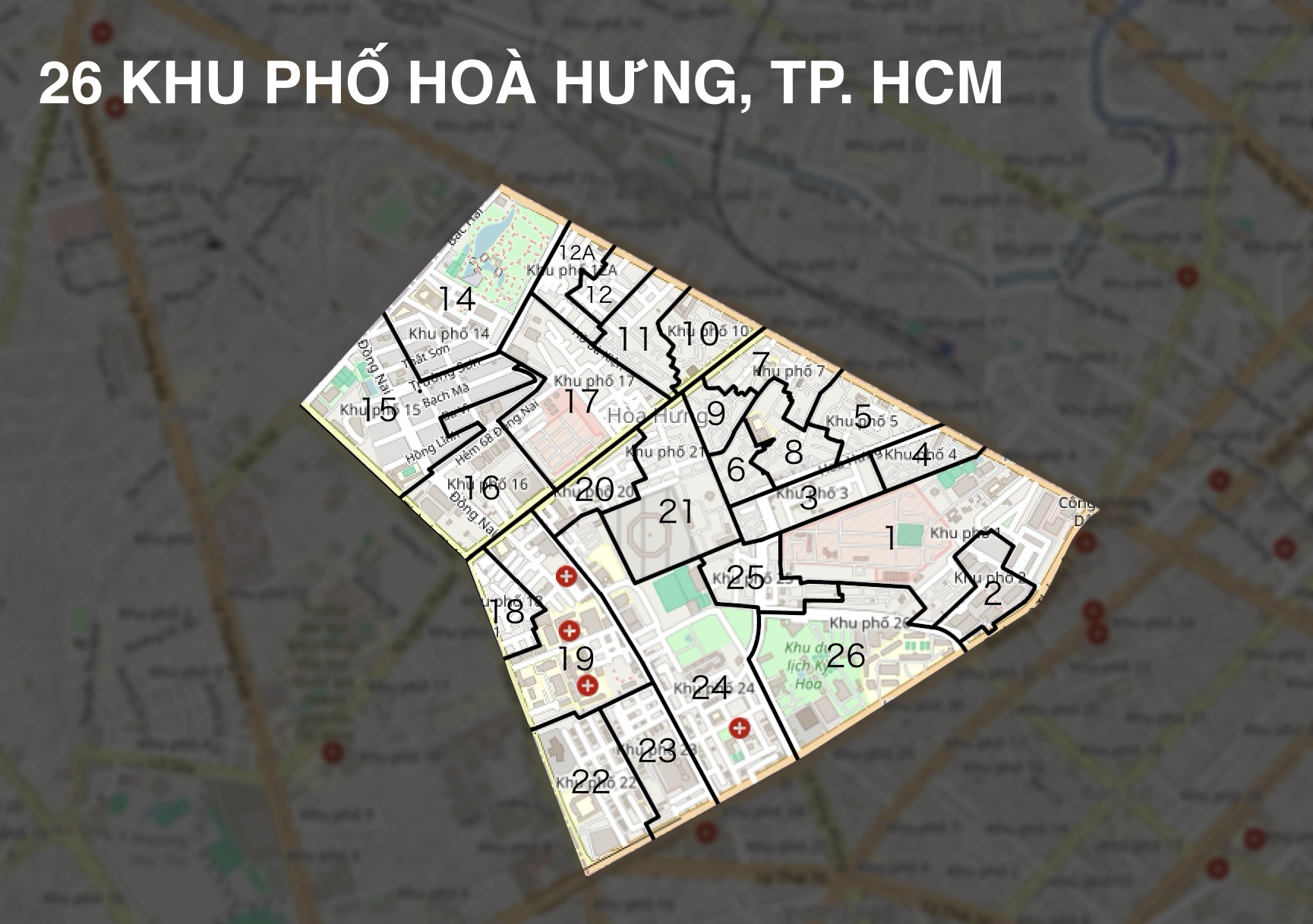
Map of the 26 neighborhoods (khu phố) of Hoà Hưng ward

Hòa Hưng is located around the geographic center of Ho Chi Minh City, roughly 5 kilometers northwest of Sài Gòn ward, and borders Tân Hòa to the north, Nhiêu Lộc to the northeast/east, Vườn Lài to the south, and Diên Hồng to the west. The ward has a total area of 2.59 km².

Map of the 41 neighborhoods of Hoà Hưng ward, pre-2026

=== Administrative divisions ===
Hòa Hưng is currently divided into 26 neighborhoods (khu phố), numbered from '1' to '26', (Note: With the exception of '13', which is instead '12A'.) across a total of 23,269 officially-recognized households (2026).

==== Administrative history ====
Immediately following the ward's establishment, however, Hòa Hưng was initially divided into 41 neighborhoods, numbered '1' to '41'.

In May of 2026, as part of Decree No. 185/2026/NĐ-CP by the Government of Vietnam and Plan No. 249/KH-UBND by the People's Committee of Ho Chi Minh City on the rearrangement of neighborhoods (khu phố), hamlets (ấp, thôn), and residential areas (khu dân cư), Hòa Hưng would reduce its number of neighborhoods from 41 to 26.

== Demographics ==
According to Dispatch No. 2896/BNV-CQĐP enacted by the Ministry of Home Affairs on 27 May 2025, Hòa Hưng ward had a total population of 96,414 and a population density of roughly 37.225 people per km² (as recorded on 31 December 2024).

== Economy ==
The Viettel Complex is a rental office building owned by the Viettel Asset Management Company.

In 2025, the total value of production in Hòa Hưng reached a growth rate of over 10.7%. In the same year, the total state budget revenue exceeded 2 trillion VND (approx. $76.04 million USD in December 2025), whereas local budget revenue reached nearly 30 billion VND (approx. $1.14 million USD in December 2025); each achieving 130% and 207.25% of their respective targets.

=== Commerce ===
Hoà Hưng’s commercial scene plays a pivotal role in the ward’s economy and culture, ranging from tourism (e.g. medical tourism) to food and entertainment. Moreover, they are prevalent, although not exclusively found, among Hoà Hưng’s two existing "specialized commercial streets".

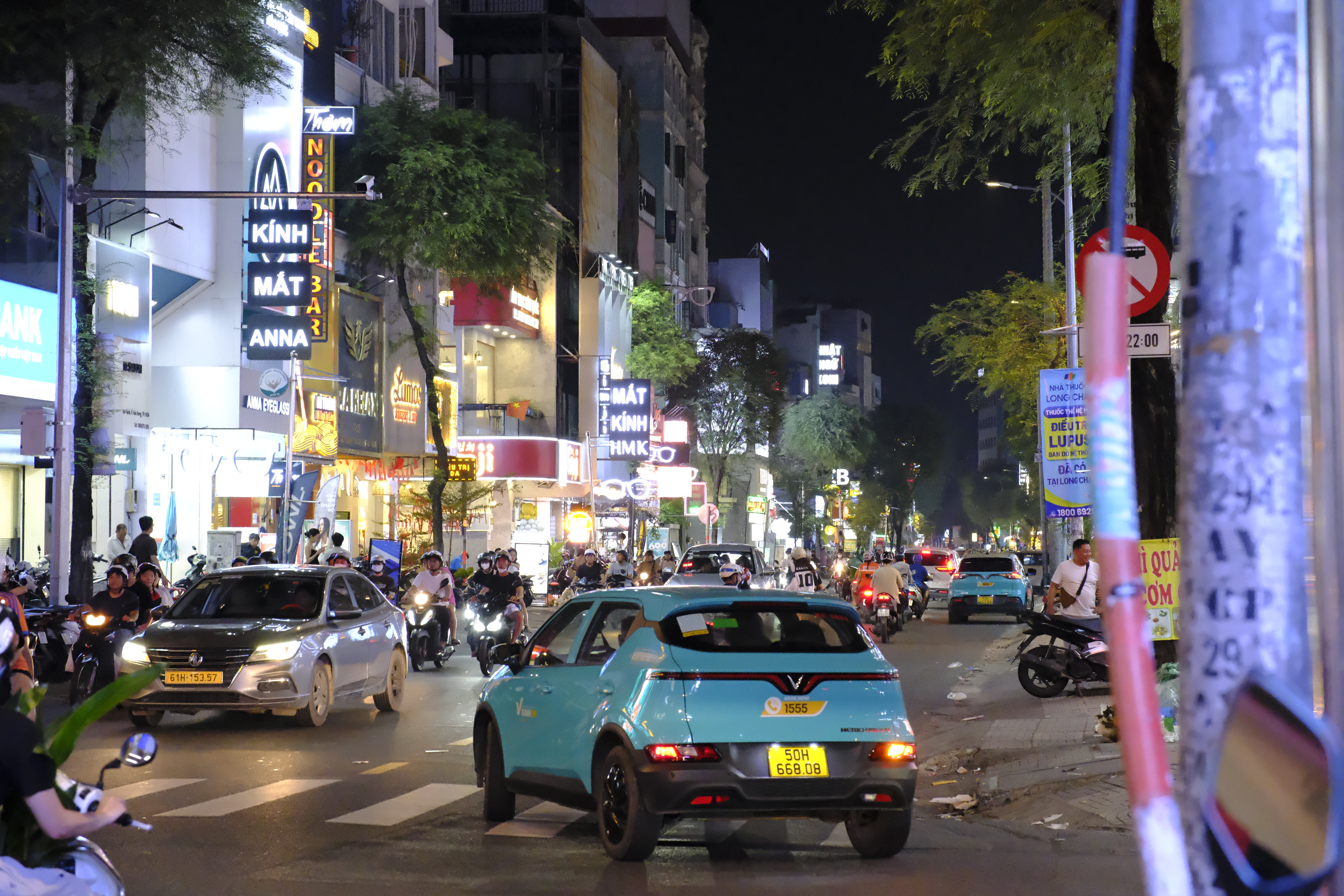
A segment of the "District 10 Health Street" on Sư Vạn Hạnh St.

==== Commercial streets/areas (Tuyến phố chuyên doanh) ====
There currently exists two commercial streets in modern-day Hòa Hưng: the "District 10 Health Street" (Phố sức khỏe Quận 10) on Sư Vạn Hạnh St. and the "Construction Materials Street" (Phố chuyên doanh vật liệu xây dựng) on Thành Thái and Tô Hiến Thành St; both of which were established in mid-2023 to aid in economic and commercial development.

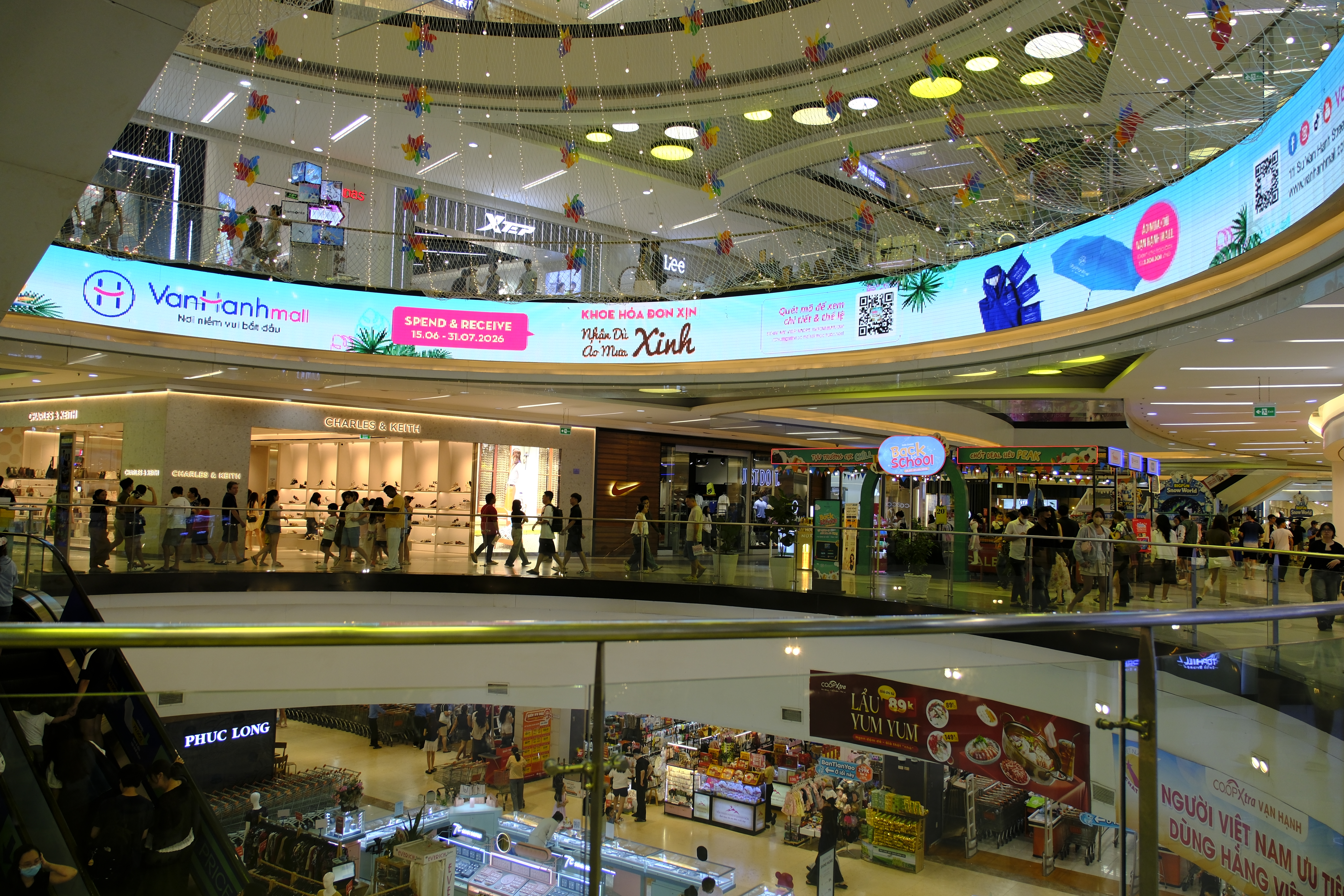
Inside Vạn Hạnh Mall

The "District 10 Health Street" (Phố sức khỏe Quận 10) is an officially-designated, 2,800 meter-long "health street", spanning across the entire segment of Sư Vạn Hạnh St situated in modern-day Hòa Hưng ward (from the intersection at Ba Tháng Hai Street to Tô Hiến Thành Street). The health street originally came about in July 2023 alongside other state-funded projects, aimed at "the development of medical tourism and ways of combining it with other local services such as entertainment, shopping, and tourist accommodations".

Hence, despite being a health street on paper, the area still offers various other commercial services, notably in places such as Vạn Hạnh Mall.

On the other hand, the "Construction Materials Street" (Phố chuyên doanh vật liệu xây dựng) sits on Thành Thái and Tô Hiến Thành St; an overwhelming majority of which is part of modern-day Hòa Hưng. It was established following a period of income slowdown in the aftermath of the COVID-19 pandemic, in an attempt to "effectively manage" and restore the development of businesses in the area. Immediately after the street's grand opening in April 2023, there was reported to have been from 147 to 150 businesses, specializing in manufactured goods as well as raw materials.

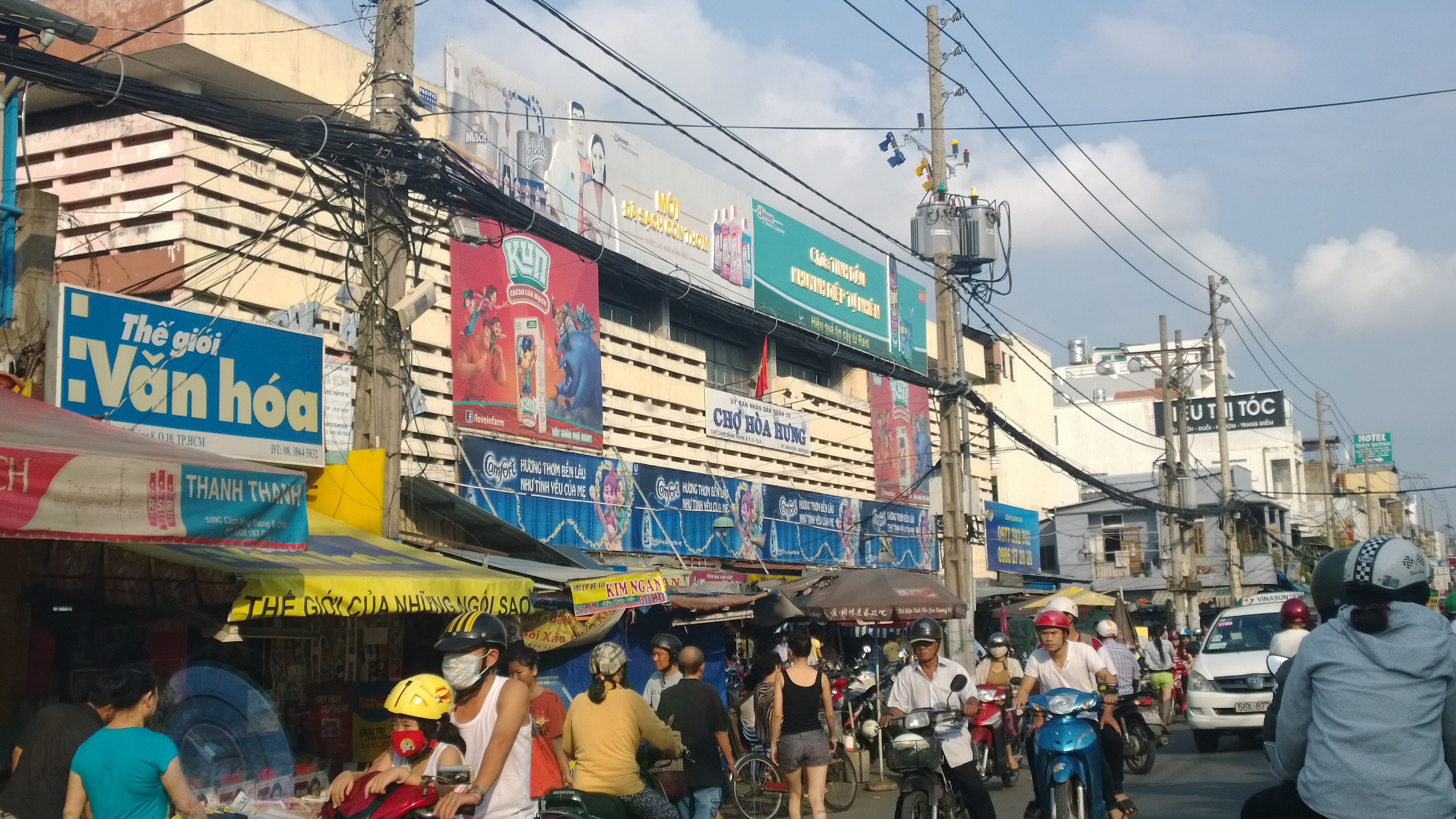
Hòa Hưng Market

===== Markets =====
Aside from commercial streets and unofficial street markets, the ward harbors two traditional indoor markets; more specifically Hòa Hưng Market and Chí Hòa Market. Both specialize in a plethora of commodities.

Among the two, Hòa Hưng Market stands out as the largest and oldest-surviving indoor market in the area. Founded in the early 1960s, the market would undergo various renovations three decades into its existence, including expansions to the market's total area. A gradual decline in sales has raised concerns regarding the market's future livelihood.

The GO! Miền Đông Market (formerly the Big C Miền Đông Market) is a hypermarket which specializes in a variety of general goods and services. One of the many GO! locations in Vietnam, the market is owned by Central Retail, a public subsidiary of the Thai conglomerate Central Group.

== Culture ==
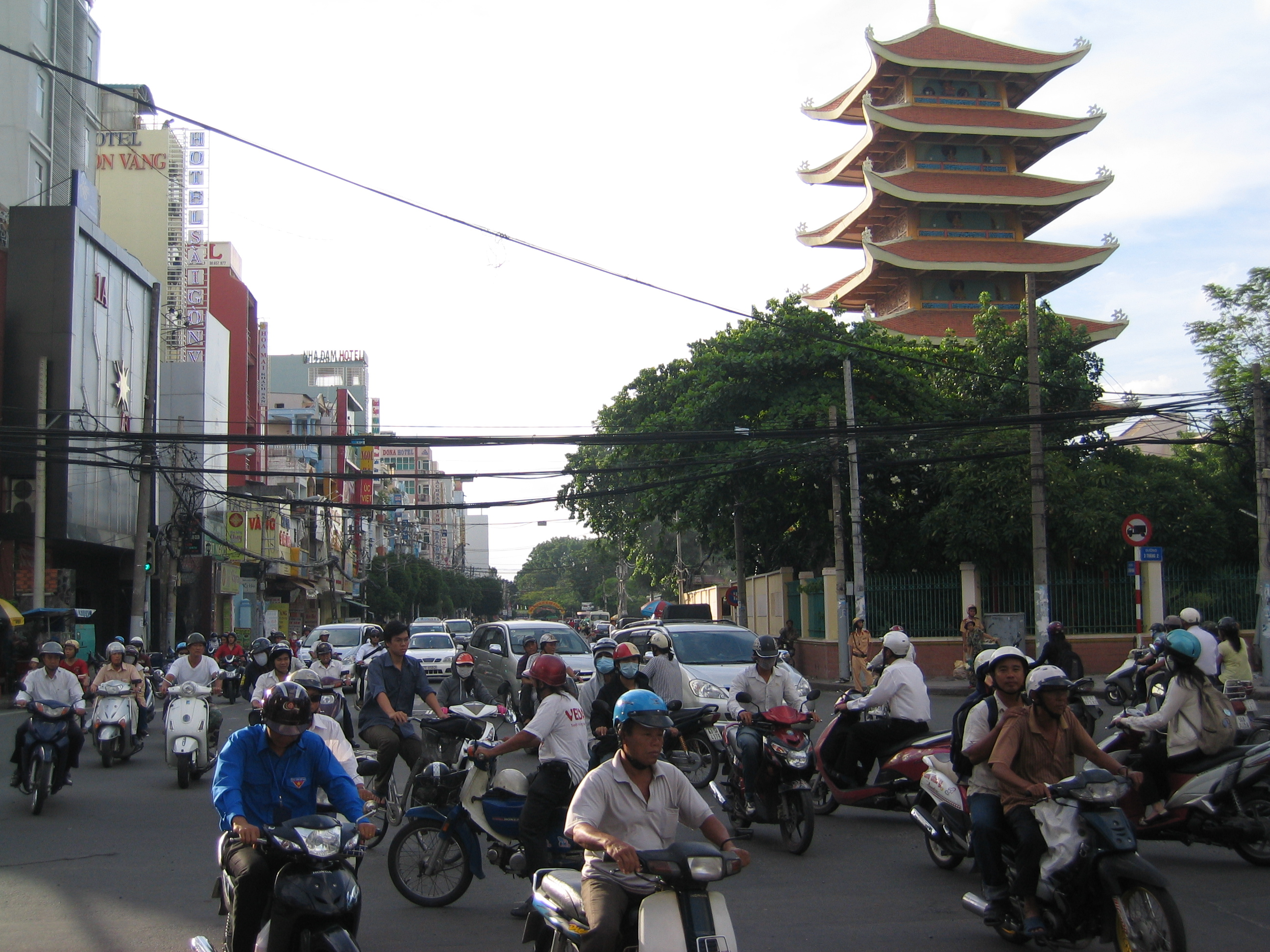
Việt Nam Quốc Tự, as viewed from Lê Hồng Phong St.

=== Religion ===
Buddhism and Catholicism are the two predominant religions in Hòa Hưng.

The "Việt Nam Quốc Tự" (Chữ Hán: 越南國寺; lit. 'Vietnam National Pagoda') is a 63-metre, 13-storey Mahayana Buddhist pagoda, located just opposite Vườn Lài on Ba Tháng Hai Street.

The tallest pagoda in Ho Chi Minh City, Việt Nam Quốc Tự serves as one of the city's central religious sites; it is known for housing the headquarters of the Ho Chi Minh City Standing Management Board of the Vietnamese Buddhist Sangha as well as the sacred heart relic of Venerable Thích Quảng Đức.

==== List of places of worship ====
Name	Address
Việt Nam Quốc Tự (越南國寺)	244 Ba Tháng Hai
Bửu Đà Pagoda	419/11 Cách Mạng Tháng Tám
Hòa Hưng Church	104 Tô Hiến Thành
Đồng Tiến Church	54 Thành Thái
Đình Chí Hòa	Alley 475 Cách Mạng Tháng Tám

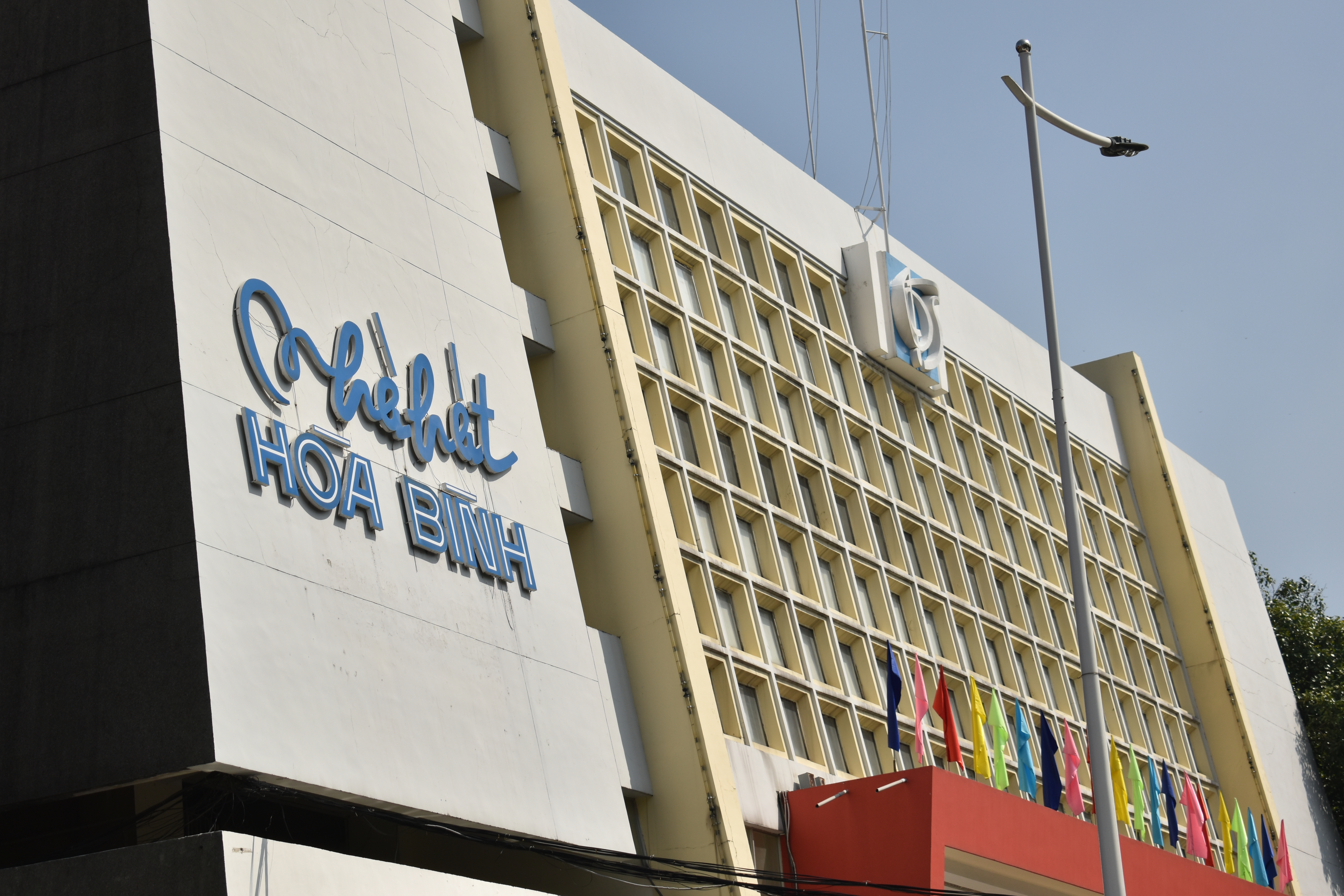
Side view of the Hòa Bình Theater's façade, 2019

=== Arts ===
==== Theatres ====
Adjacent to Việt Nam Quốc Tự is the Hòa Bình Theater (lit. 'Peace Theater'), which hosts a wide range of shows, including but not exclusive to: variety music shows, art performances, cultural events and films..., within its 2000-seat auditorium. A multi-use theater, films are aired from 4 PM daily (with exceptions for certain events & performances), during which the auditorium hall would be repurposed into a movie theatre.

==== Museums ====
The Museum of Traditional Vietnamese Medicine (or the "FITO Museum") is a medical museum, housed in a six-storey building spanning a total area of nearly 600m². Its 3,000 medicine-related replicas and artifacts — including historic medicinal documents, pharmaceutical tools and containers — are situated across 18 exhibition rooms throughout the facility. The museum also features various specimens of plants, animals and minerals each used for medicinal purposes.

=== Notable people ===
- Võ Trường Toản (1709 - 1792), scholar and renowned teacher of 18th-century Gia Định, known in the area for establishing and teaching at a school in Đình Chí Hòa, communal house of the former hamlet / village of Hòa Hưng.

== Sports and recreation ==
=== Parks ===
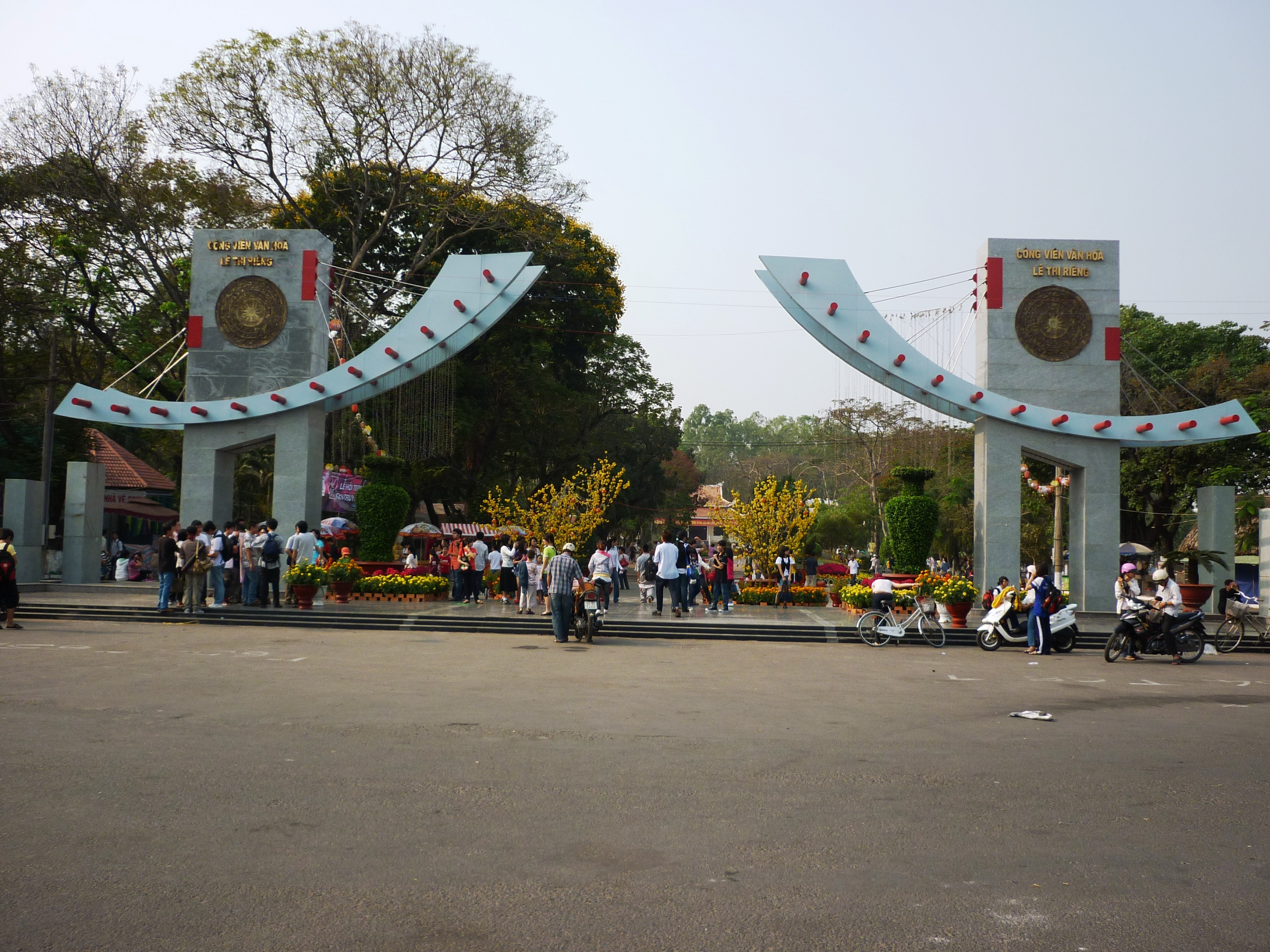
Gate to the Lê Thị Riêng Cultural Park on Cách Mạng Tháng Tám Street (2011)

The Lê Thị Riêng Cultural Park is a 9 ha (22.2-acre) park surrounded by streets: Cách Mạng Tháng Tám to the north, Trường Sơn to the east/southeast, and Bắc Hải to the west/northwest. South-east of the park, there consists of 3 tennis courts and 2 swimming pools, which are under the management of their two, respective clubs: the Lê Thị Riêng Park Tennis Club and the Lê Thị Riêng Swimming Club (as part of the "Nhân Thư Sports Centre").

The artificial lake in the heart of the area acts as a recreational fishing spot. Within the park's east and northeast sections is the smaller, Thỏ Trắng Amusement Park (Thiên đường Giải trí Thỏ Trắng; lit. 'White Rabbit entertainment paradise'), a private amusement park owned by a joint stock company of the same name. At the heart of the amusement park is a recreation center (among many operated by leisure company Jump Arena), famous for its trampolines and other sports activities offered.

==== Defunct parks ====
Historically, there had existed the Kỳ Hòa Park (or the Hồ Kỳ Hòa Park), a 14 ha park which emerged as one of Ho Chi Minh City's "top 3 entertainment areas" alongside Đầm Sen Park and Saigon Zoo and Botanical Gardens in the 1990s. The park would gradually cease operations in the years which followed; the area it once stood being replaced by restaurants, pubs and other buildings, with "not a single trace" of the ferris wheel deemed 'iconic' to the park. The name "Kỳ Hòa", however, is still retained when referring to the area, as is Hòa Hưng as a whole.

=== Others ===
Other recreational places include the Nguyễn Tri Phương Swimming Pool and CITIGYM on Thành Thái St.

== Government ==
Headquarters	Address	Image
The Party Committee, the People's Council, the People's Committee & Vietnam Fatherland Front Committee of Hòa Hưng Ward	TT20 Tam Đảo St.	
Department of Economy, Infrastructure and Urban Affairs	TT20 Tam Đảo St.	
Office of Cultural and Social Affairs	TT20 Tam Đảo St.	
Public Administration Service Center of Hòa Hưng Ward	TT20 Tam Đảo St.	
People's Police of Hòa Hưng Ward	Main location: 436/9 Ba Tháng Hai St.	
People's Police of Hòa Hưng Ward	On-call criminal duties: 436/5 Ba Tháng Hai St.	
Military Command of Hòa Hưng Ward	A4 - A8 Châu Thới St.	

=== Infrastructure ===
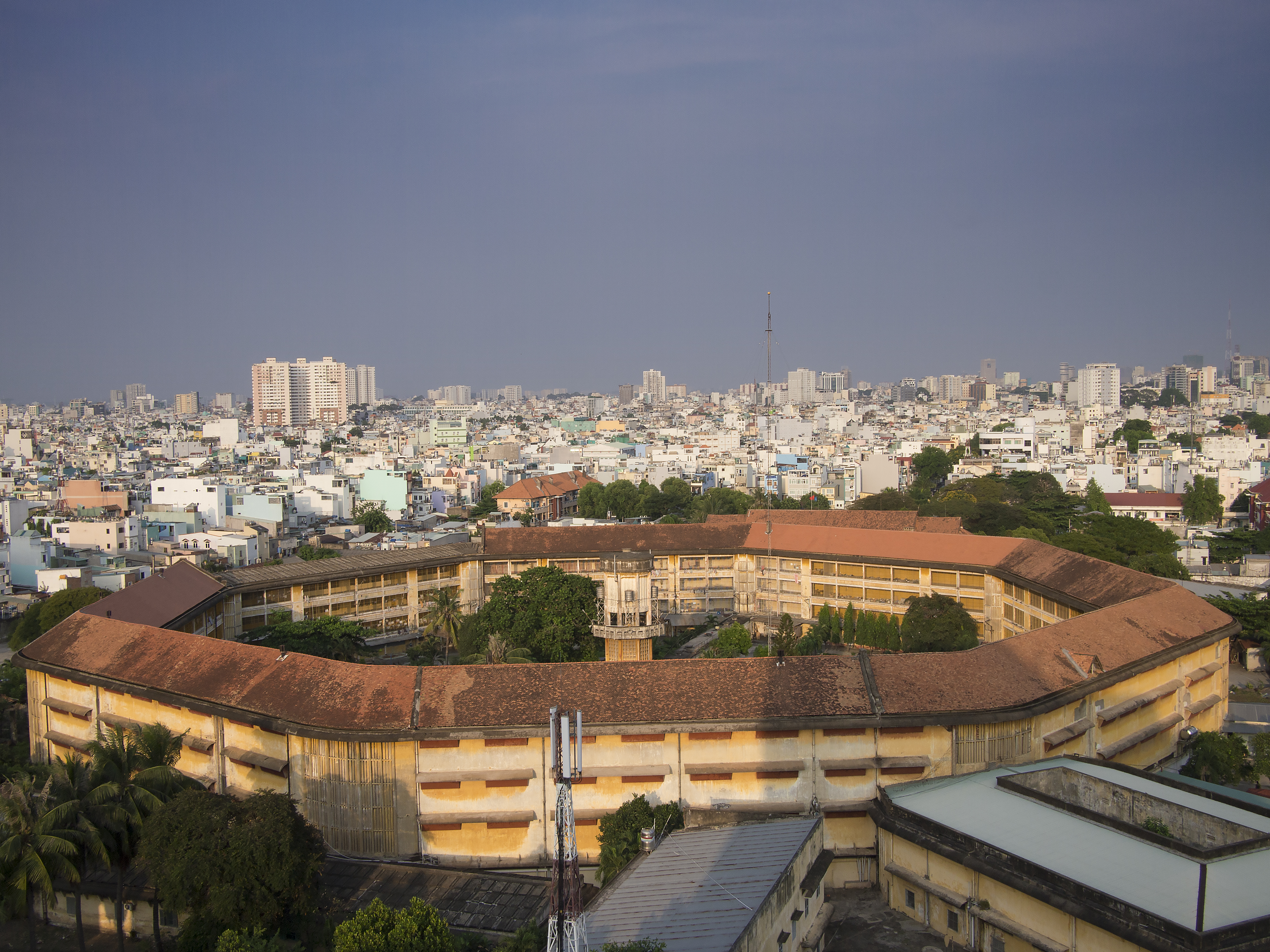
Chí Hòa Prison, 2016

Hòa Hưng houses the headquarters of the Ho Chi Minh City Military Command on 291 Cách Mạng Tháng Tám Street; a defense unit of the 7th Military Region of the People's Army of Vietnam serving Ho Chi Minh City. Several buildings are located within the complex, such as the Ho Chi Minh City Armed Forces Traditional House.

The Chí Hòa Prison began its construction by the French in 1943 as a replacement for the Saigon Grand Prison (Maison Centrale de Saigon). The Japanese would briefly take control of the project during its short-lived administration of French Indochina, before, not having finalized constructions prior to their surrender following WWII, returning it to the French, who successfully completed the prison on the 3rd of March, 1953.

During French rule, the prison was used to incarcerate political prisoners, more specifically those opposed to French colonization, whereas during the Vietnam War, prisoners comprised members of the NLF (Viet Cong).

The prison currently serves as a detention facility for suspects accused of crimes based in Ho Chi Minh City and is now administered by the Ho Chi Minh City Police.

== Health ==
=== Healthcare facilities ===
Name	Address	Website	Notes
Post Office General Hospital (Bệnh viện Đa khoa Bưu Điện)	B9 Thành Thái		
District 10 Hospital / Medical Centre (Bệnh viện / Trung tâm Y tế Quận 10)	571 Sư Vạn Hạnh		Located on the "District 10 Health Street"
People's Hospital 115 (Bệnh viện Nhân dân 115)	E.R, on-demand check-ups (Gates 4, 3): 527 Sư Vạn Hạnh		Located on the "District 10 Health Street"
People's Hospital 115 (Bệnh viện Nhân dân 115)	High-tech zone: 818 Sư Vạn Hạnh		Located on the "District 10 Health Street"
People's Hospital 115 (Bệnh viện Nhân dân 115)	Research & Development Center (Gate 1): 3 Dương Quang Trung		
People's Hospital 115 (Bệnh viện Nhân dân 115)	Health insurance check-ups: 88 Thành Thái		
Vạn Hạnh General Hospital (Bệnh viện Đa khoa Vạn Hạnh)	B1-B3-B5, Alley 781 Lê Hồng Phong		

== Education ==
=== Universities (Đại học) ===
Name of institution	Address	Website	Notes
Vietnam Military Medical University - Southern Branch (Phân hiệu phía Nam Học viện Quân y)	84 Thành Thái		
Academy of Public Administration and Governance - Ho Chi Minh City Campus (Phân hiệu Học viện Hành chính Quốc gia tại Thành phố Hồ Chí Minh)	10 Ba Tháng Hai		
Ho Chi Minh City University of Foreign Languages and Information Technology (Trường Đại học Ngoại ngữ – Tin học Thành phố Hồ Chí Minh)	828 Sư Vạn Hạnh		Main campus
Ho Chi Minh City University of Foreign Languages and Information Technology (Trường Đại học Ngoại ngữ – Tin học Thành phố Hồ Chí Minh)	M4–M7–M9 Thất Sơn		
Ho Chi Minh City University of Foreign Languages and Information Technology (Trường Đại học Ngoại ngữ – Tin học Thành phố Hồ Chí Minh)	298–304 Cao Thắng		
Pham Ngoc Thach University of Medicine (Trường Đại học Y khoa Phạm Ngọc Thạch)	2 Dương Quang Trung		

=== High schools (Trung học phổ thông / THPT), escalator schools offering high school education ===
Name of institution	Address	Website	Notes
Nguyễn Du High School (Trường THPT Nguyễn Du)	XX1 Đồng Nai		Public school
Nguyễn Khuyến High School (Trường THPT Nguyễn Khuyến)	50 Thành Thái		Public school
Duy Tân Secondary & High School (Trường THCS và THPT Duy Tân)	106 Nguyễn Giản Thanh		Private school
Vạn Hạnh Primary, Secondary & High School (Trường Tiểu học - THCS - THPT Vạn Hạnh)	781E Lê Hồng Phong		Private school

=== Secondary schools (Trung học cơ sở / THCS) ===
The following list does not include escalator schools which offer high school education.

Name of institution	Address	Notes
Cách Mạng Tháng Tám Secondary School (Trường THCS Cách Mạng Tháng Tám)	289 Cách Mạng Tháng Tám	
Hòa Hưng Secondary School (Trường THCS Hòa Hưng)	493/73A Cách Mạng Tháng Tám	
Lạc Hồng Secondary School (Trường THCS Lạc Hồng)	436/4 Ba Tháng Hai	
Lạc Hồng Secondary School (Trường THCS Lạc Hồng)	436B/34 Ba Tháng Hai	Campus 2
Trần Phú Secondary School (Trường THCS Trần Phú)	82 Cửu Long	

=== Primary schools (Trường tiểu học) ===
Name of institution	Address
Bắc Hải Primary School (Trường Tiểu học Bắc Hải)	103–105 Bắc Hải
Hoàng Diệu Primary School (Trường Tiểu học Hoàng Diệu)	283/44 Cách Mạng Tháng Tám
Lê Thị Riêng Primary School (Trường Tiểu học Lê Thị Riêng)	493 Cách Mạng Tháng Tám
Thiên Hộ Dương Primary School (Trường Tiểu học Thiên Hộ Dương)	341 Tô Hiến Thành
Tô Hiến Thành Primary School (Trường Tiểu học Tô Hiến Thành)	104 Tô Hiến Thành
Triệu Thị Trinh Primary School (Trường Tiểu học Triệu Thị Trinh)	91/8D Hòa Hưng

=== Other institutions ===
The District 10 Children's House (Nhà Thiếu nhi Quận 10) is a young pioneer palace located on Bắc Hải St., near its intersection with Thành Thái St. With a total area of 7000m², the building was inaugurated on 1 June 2014 (coinciding with that year's Children's Day celebrations) and currently offers various extracurricular classes.

The building’s fourth floor also serves as headquarters of the Hoàng Thái Thanh Drama Theater, a private theater company founded in 2010 and, for the first four years of its existence, initially based at the Ho Chi Minh City Children’s House (located in Xuân Hoà ward).

== Transportation ==
Section of Cách Mạng Tháng Tám St. opposite Lê Thị Riêng Cultural Park

=== Roads ===
Major roads include: Cách Mạng Tháng Tám to the northeast (along its border with Nhiêu Lộc), Ba Tháng Hai to the south (along its border with Vườn Lài), Thành Thái to the west (along its border with Diên Hồng), alongside Tô Hiến Thành and Sự Vạn Hạnh.

=== Public transportation ===
The following Ho Chi Minh City Metro stations serve Hòa Hưng:

- L2 04 Hòa Hưng (under construction)
- L2 05 Lê Thị Riêng (under construction)

The following bus routes serve Hòa Hưng:

- : to Bus Depot No. 1 (Phan Văn Trị St., An Nhơn ward) via Ba Tháng Hai St.
- : to Miền Tây station (lit. 'Western station'; An Phú Đông ward) via Ba Tháng Hai St.
- : to Ngã Tư Ga station (An Lạc ward) via streets: Thành Thái, Tam Đảo, Đồng Nai, Trường Sơn, and Cách Mạng Tháng Tám.
