= Ho Chi Minh City University of Foreign Languages and Information Technology =

Vietnamese university

Ho Chi Minh City University of Foreign Languages - Information Technology
- Đại Học Ngoại Ngữ - Tin Học Thành phố Hồ Chí Minh
- Type: Private
- Established: 26 October 1992
- President: Huynh The Cuoc
- Vice-president: Tran Thanh Nhan
- Vice-Chancellor: Dr. Nguyen Anh Tuan
- Location: 828 Sư Vạn Hạnh, Hòa Hưng, Ho Chi Minh City, Vietnam
- Website: www.huflit.edu.vn

Ho Chi Minh City University of Foreign Languages - Information Technology (abbreviation: HUFLIT) is a university located at 828 Sư Vạn Hạnh St., Hòa Hưng ward, Ho Chi Minh City, Vietnam. Date of foundation: October 26, 1992, according to Decision No. 616/Ttg by the Prime Minister of the Socialist Republic of Vietnam. HUFLIT is the first private university in Ho Chi Minh City and South Vietnam on the basis of former Saigon Foreign Languages and Information Technology School which was established in 1992.

HUFLIT is a tertiary education institution (basing on the credit system) directly supervised and managed by the Ministry of Education and Training.

HUFLIT's greatest objective is to educate and train intellectuals to gain a tertiary education, having knowledge related to a specialized field as well as to good practical and professional skills that meet the needs of the market economy. The academic curriculum of HUFLIT is suitable for Vietnamese requirements and comparable to the curriculum of advanced universities in the world.

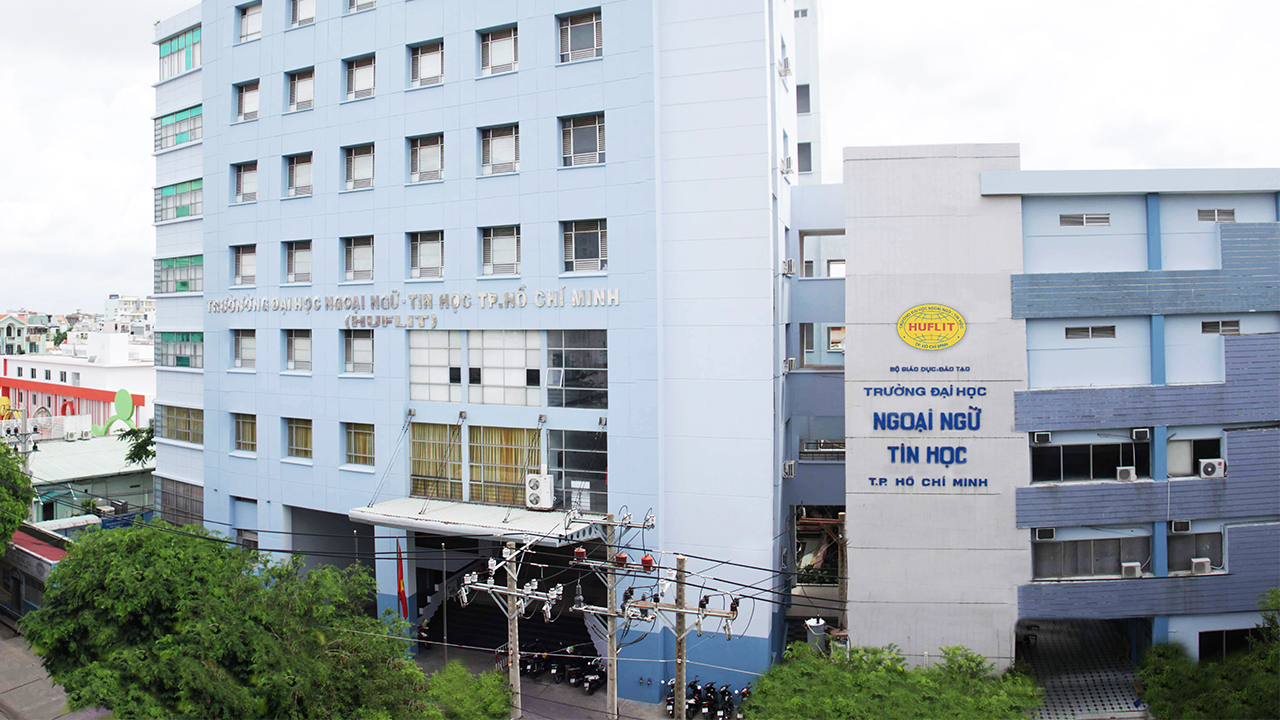
HUFLIT Campus at Su Van Hanh street

== Faculties ==
- Faculty of Foreign Languages (English and Chinese)
- Faculty of Information Technology
- Faculty of Oriental Languages and Cultures (Japanese, Korean, Chinese)
- Department of International Business Administration
- Faculty of Tourism and Hospitality
- Faculty of International Relations
- Faculty of Accounting - Finance
- Faculty of Second Degree (English, Chinese, BA)
- Faculty of Political Reasoning
- Faculty of Law
