= Lê Thị Riêng Cultural Park =

Park in Ho Chi Minh City, Vietnam

- Công viên Lê Thị Riêng
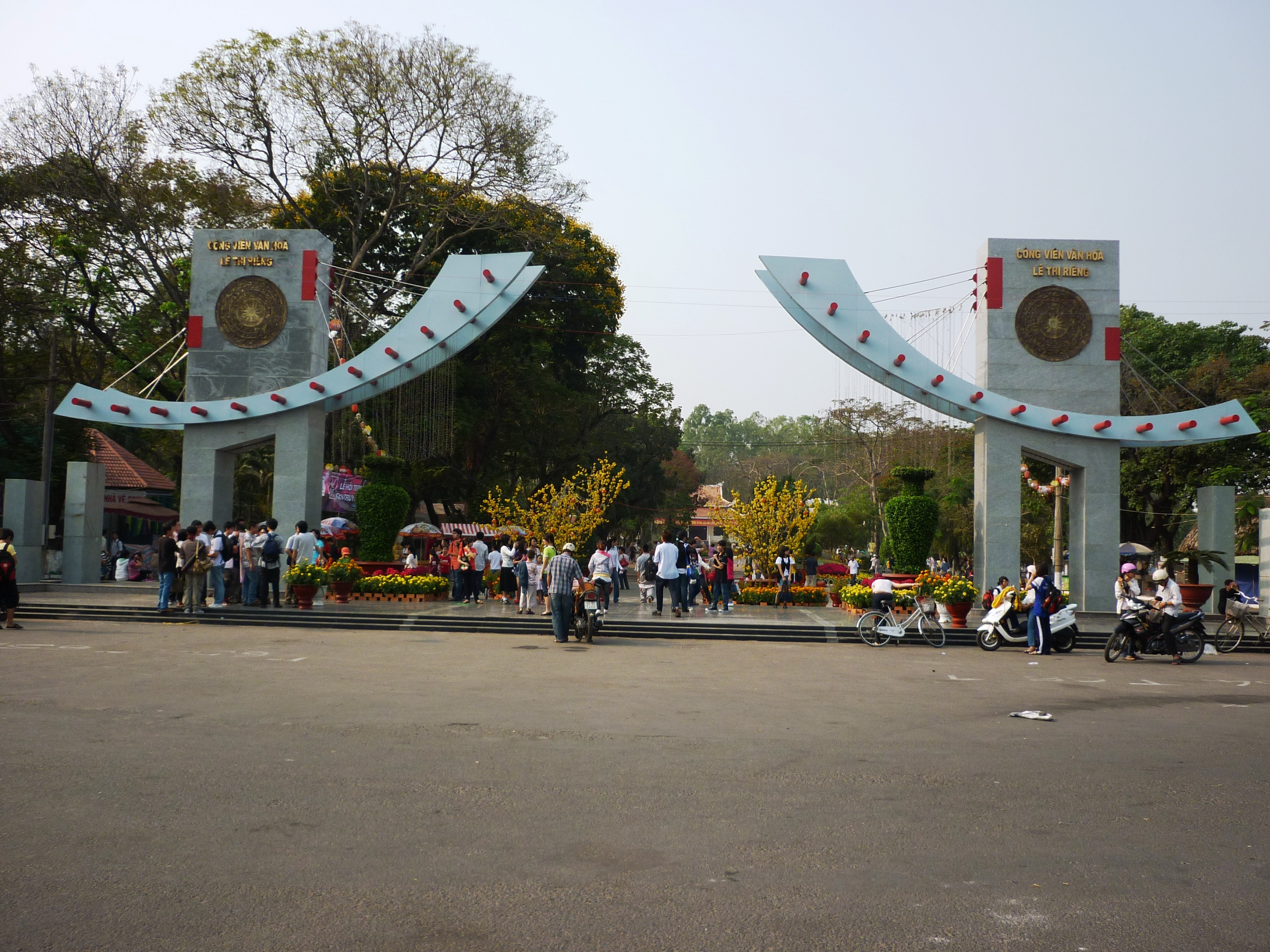
- The main entrance of the park in 2011
- Interactive map of Lê Thị Riêng Cultural Park
- Location: Hòa Hưng ward, Ho Chi Minh City (Saigon)
- Coordinates: 10°47′06″N 106°39′52″E
- Area: 8 hectares (20 acres)
- Created: 1983; 43 years ago
- Open: 1983
- Status: Opening
- Public transit: L2 Lê Thị Riêng station (under construction); Bus

Lê Thị Riêng Cultural Park (Vietnamese: Công viên Văn hóa Lê Thị Riêng) is a park located in Hòa Hưng, Ho Chi Minh City, Vietnam.

Formerly known (prior to the Fall of Saigon) as the Chí Hòa - Chợ Quán Cemetery (Vietnamese: Nghĩa địa Chí Hòa - Chợ Quán), the park was inaugurated on the 19th of March, 1988; named in honor of female cadre, martyr and national hero Lê Thị Riêng.

== Design ==
The park is surrounded by Cách Mạng Tháng 8 Street, Trường Sơn Street, Bắc Hải Street and Alley 95 Bắc Hải, covering an area of approximately 8 hectares (20 acres) in District 10, opposite of District 3. Within the park, there is a lake that used to be a canal, next to Bắc Hải Street, connected to the Nhieu Loc–Thi Nghe Channel via the Canal de Ceinture (Vietnamese: Kênh Vành Đai, Kênh Vòng Thành; lit. Belt Canal). Near the park entrance, there is a communist propaganda house and a memorial plaque commemorating the events of the Tet Offensive. The park is the site of the tomb of Lê Thị Riêng, a member of the committee of the National Liberation Front for South Vietnam, better known as Viet Cong. Additionally, there is a memorial plaque for Trần Phú, the first General Secretary of the Indochinese Communist Party, marking the discovery of his tomb in 1999.

This park allocates 20% of its land area for commercial leasing, including a children's playground area (known as White Rabbit Amusement Park; Thiên đường Giải trí Thỏ Trắng) covering 1 hectare (2.5 acres), a bookstore area, and food stalls.

== History ==
During the Republic of Vietnam era, this area was a 30 hectares (74 acres) cemetery known as Chí Hòa Cemetery (also known as Nghĩa địa Đô Thành Chí Hòa, literally "Chí Hòa Capital City Cemetery" (Note: Shortly known as Capital Cemetery (Nghĩa địa Đô Thành). However, before 1975, there were two other cemeteries also known as Capital Cemetery are Phú Thọ Hòa Cemetery in Phú Thọ area of former District 11, Ho Chi Minh City and Mạc Đĩnh Chi Cemetery, now is Lê Văn Tám Park in Đa Kao (later known as Tân Định, Ho Chi Minh City))). Nearby this area is the Chi Hoa Prison, Chí Hòa Priests' Cemetery, and further away is the Phu Tho National Technical Center. In 1968, after significant casualties on both South Vietnamese and Viet Cong forces during the Tet Offensive, the Saigon municipal government excavated large pits in the cemetery to bury thousands of bodies, which led to various superstitious rumors.

In response, the Long Hoa Saigon Buddhist Association built a temple and a statue of Kṣitigarbha Bodhisattva in the cemetery. The statue, made of nearly 10 tons of black Italian marble and crafted by sculptor Mai Lan, measures 0.75 metres (2.5 ft) wide and stands on a 3 metres (9.8 ft) pedestal. In 1983, as part of efforts to renovate the urban landscape, authorities cleared the Chi Hoa Cemetery to build the park. On August 23, 1986, the statue of Kṣitigarbha Bodhisattva was dismantled and relocated to Quan Âm Pagoda in Bửu Hòa, Biên Hòa, Đồng Nai.

== Public transport ==
There are bus routes available to Lê Thị Riêng Cultural Park. Line 2 of Ho Chi Minh City Metro is also under construction, disembarking at Lê Thị Riêng Station.
