= Việt Nam Quốc Tự =

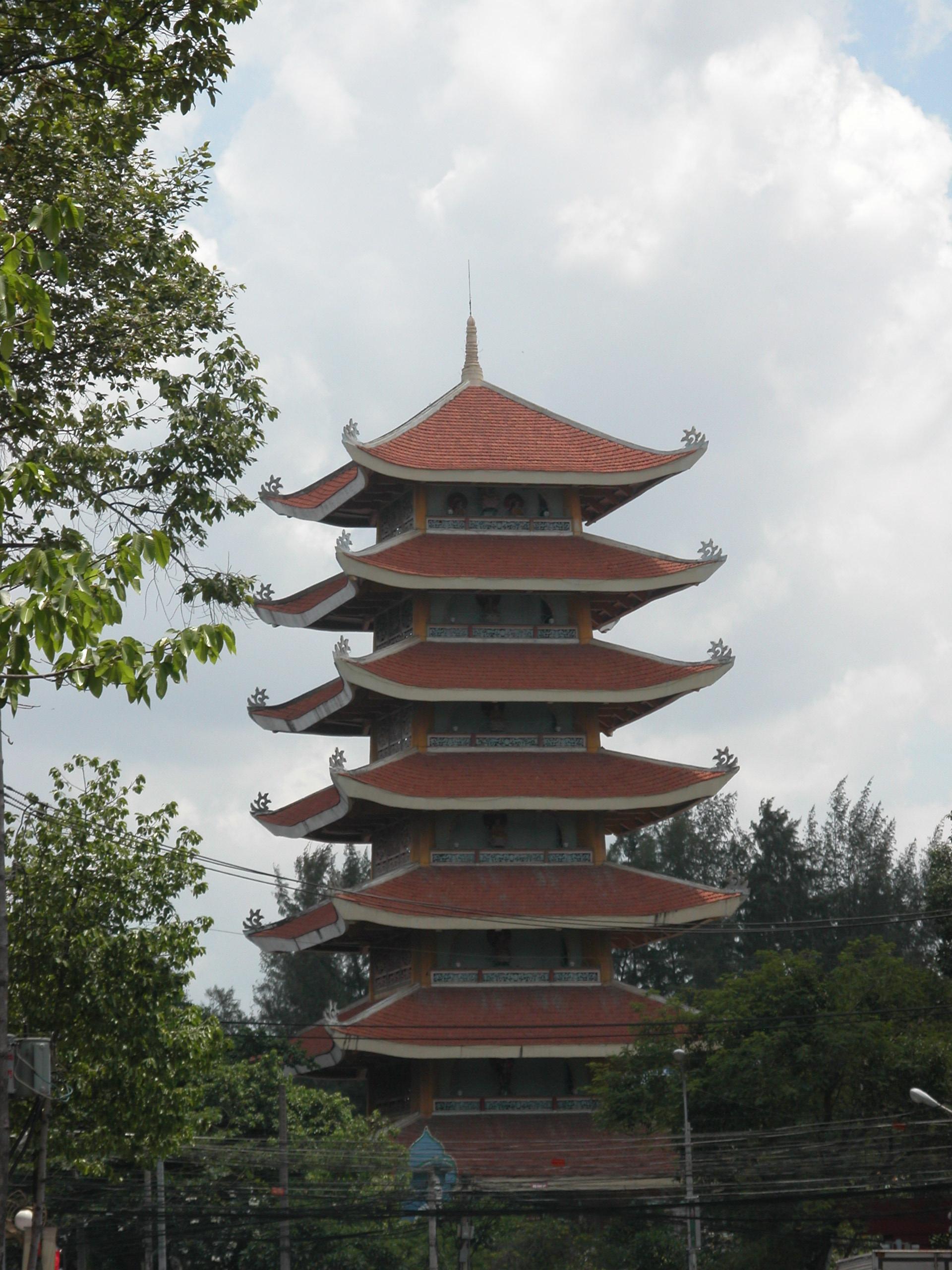

- Location within Vietnam

Religion
- Affiliation: Buddhism

Location
- Location: 3/2 Blvd., Hòa Hưng ward, Ho Chi Minh City
- Country: Vietnam
- Interactive map of Việt Nam Quốc Tự
- Coordinates: 10.7711539°N 106.6732228°E

Architecture
- Completed: April 26, 1964; 62 years ago

The Việt Nam Quốc Tự (lit. 'Vietnam National Pagoda') is located on 3/2 Blvd., Hòa Hưng ward, Ho Chi Minh City, Vietnam. The pagoda, seven stories tall, is full of colorful, oversized statues of religious figures. On the first and fifteenth of the month, the pagoda opens up its third and seventh floors to the public. On other days, the second floor is accessible; it features a shrine made up of miniature Buddhas floating against a cloudy sky mural.

The pagoda was built in 1963.
