= People's Committee (Vietnam) =

Executive branch of provincial, rural district, and communal government

The People's Committee (Vietnamese: Ủy ban Nhân dân) is a key local governmental body in Vietnam, serving as both the executive arm of the People's Council and the local state administrative authority. It operates across different administrative levels—provincial, district, and commune—each with distinct organizational structures, duties, and powers. People's Committees are responsible for implementing state management functions in various sectors at the local level, such as socio-economic development, national defense, and public security.

The People's Committee plays a pivotal role in local governance across all administrative levels in Vietnam. By managing socio-economic development, public services, and national defense, it ensures that central government policies are effectively implemented at the grassroots level. Its organizational structure and functions are clearly defined in Vietnam's Law on Local Government Organization, ensuring a streamlined and effective administrative process.

== Definition and role ==
The People's Committee, according to Article 8 of the 2015 Law on Local Government Organization, is elected by the People's Council of the same level and acts as the executive body of the People's Council. It is tasked with implementing the resolutions passed by the People's Council and performing the role of local administrative authority. People's Committees are responsible to the local people, the People's Council, and the higher state authorities.

The term of the People's Committee coincides with that of the People's Council at the same level. Even after the People's Council’s term ends, the People's Committee continues its functions until a new Council is elected.

== Organizational structure of People's Committees ==
=== Provincial People's Committee ===
The Provincial People's Committee is composed of a Chairman, Vice Chairpersons, and members. The number of Vice Chairpersons depends on the classification of the province:

- Type I provinces can have up to four Vice Chairpersons.
- Type II and Type III provinces can have up to three Vice Chairpersons.

Members of the Provincial People's Committee include the heads of specialized agencies, as well as individuals responsible for military and police affairs. These specialized agencies consist of departments that assist in managing local governance across various sectors such as agriculture, industry, education, and health.

=== District People's Committee ===
At the district level, the People's Committee includes a Chairman, Vice Chairpersons (up to three for Type I districts, and two for Type II and Type III districts), and members responsible for military and police affairs. Specialized agencies at this level oversee sectors like trade, transportation, and agriculture.

=== Commune People's Committee ===
Commune People's Committees have a simpler structure compared to the provincial and district levels. They consist of a Chairman, a Vice Chairman, and members responsible for military and police matters. The number of Vice Chairpersons depends on the commune's classification:

- Type I and Type II communes can have up to two Vice Chairpersons.
- Type III communes have only one Vice Chairperson.

== Duties and powers of People's Committees ==
=== Provincial People's Committee ===
The Provincial People's Committee is responsible for implementing the province’s socio-economic plans, managing natural resources, and ensuring public safety. It is also involved in national defense, education, healthcare, and disaster prevention. Furthermore, it oversees the activities of lower-level People's Committees and local departments, ensuring their smooth operation in compliance with state laws.

=== District People's Committee ===
District-level committees manage the district's socio-economic development, industrial growth, and public services like education and healthcare. They also implement state laws at the district level, manage land resources, and ensure environmental protection. The District People's Committee reports to both the Provincial People's Committee and the district’s People’s Council.

=== Commune People's Committee ===
The commune level handles smaller-scale administrative functions, including local infrastructure development, budget management, and public services such as schooling and healthcare. They ensure that national and local laws are enforced in the commune, and they coordinate closely with district-level authorities.

== Principles of organization and operation ==
The organization and operation of the People's Committees are governed by the following principles:

1. Compliance with constitution and law: The People's Committees operate strictly within the bounds of the Constitution and relevant laws. They implement the principle of democratic centralism, meaning decision-making is based on collective deliberation.
2. Transparency and accountability: The People's Committees are expected to be transparent in their activities and are subject to public oversight. Their primary function is to serve the people.
3. Majority-based decision making: The People's Council, which elects the People's Committee, operates on a majority vote system.
4. Collective leadership: The People's Committee functions collectively but is guided by the leadership of its Chairman.

== Specialized agencies under the People's Committee ==
Specialized agencies within the People's Committee serve as advisory and administrative bodies. These agencies, organized at both the provincial and district levels, assist the People's Committees in performing various state management functions, such as public health, agriculture, and education. Their responsibilities are defined by higher-level state authorities and are tailored to meet the needs of the local area.

== See also ==
- Provinces of Vietnam
- Provincial city (Vietnam)
- Municipal city
- Municipalities of Vietnam
