= List of largest companies in Vietnam =

This article lists the largest companies in Vietnam in terms of their revenue, net profit and total assets, according to the American business magazines Fortune and Forbes.

== 2024 Fortune list ==
This list displays the top 20 Vietnamese companies in the Fortune Southeast Asia 500, which ranks the largest companies in Southeast Asia by annual revenue. The figures below are given in millions of US dollars and are for the fiscal year 2023. Also listed are the headquarters location, net profit, number of employees worldwide and industry sector of each company.

Rank	Name	Industry	Revenue (USD millions)	Profits (USD millions)	Employees	Headquarters
1	Petrolimex	Oil and gas	11,502	119	26,262	Hanoi
2	Agribank	Banking	7,537	862	40,663	Hanoi
3	BIDV	Banking	7,518	902	29,327	Hanoi
4	Vingroup	Conglomerate	6,777	86	53,504	Hanoi
5	Vietinbank	Banking	6,583	836	24,642	Hanoi
6	Binh Son Refining	Oil and gas	6,189	363	1,532	Quảng Ngãi
7	Hoa Phat Group	Industrial Machinery	4,994	287	28,951	Hưng Yên
8	Mobile World Investment	Retail	4,966	7	65,414	Thủ Dầu Một
9	Petrovietnam Oil	Oil and gas	4,310	24	1,681	Hanoi
10	VPBank	Banking	4,050	419	24,973	Hanoi
11	Vietnam Airlines	Airline	3,843	(249)	21,130	Hanoi
12	Petrovietnam Gas	Oil and gas	3,776	487	2,827	Hanoi
13	MB Bank	Banking	3,688	868	16,324	Hanoi
14	Masan Group	Conglomerate	3,285	18	35,878	Ho Chi Minh City
15	Techcombank	Banking	3,181	756	11,614	Hanoi
16	Sacombank	Banking	2,673	324	18,436	Ho Chi Minh City
17	Saigon Hanoi Bank	Banking	2,647	308	6,246	Hanoi
18	Asia Commercial Bank	Banking	2,624	674	13,655	Ho Chi Minh City
19	Vinamilk	Dairy products	2,534	373	9,877	Ho Chi Minh City
20	VietJet Air	Airline	2,449	10	5,729	Hanoi

== 2024 Forbes list ==
This list is based on the Forbes Global 2000, which ranks the world's 2,000 largest publicly traded companies. The Forbes list takes into account a multitude of factors, including the revenue, net profit, total assets and market value of each company; each factor is given a weighted rank in terms of importance when considering the overall ranking. The table below also lists the headquarters location and industry sector of each company. The figures are in billions of US dollars and are for the year 2023/24. All six companies from the Vietnam are listed.

Rank	Forbes 2000 rank	Name	Industry	Revenue (billions US$)	Profit (billions US$)	Assets (billions US$)	Value (billions US$)	Headquarters
1	815	Vietcombank	Banking	5.2	1.4	71.5	20.2	Hanoi
2	899	BIDV	Banking	7.3	0.9	93.9	11.1	Hanoi
3	1,194	Vietinbank	Banking	6.4	0.8	83.8	7.0	Hanoi
4	1,345	MB Bank	Banking	3.5	0.8	36.3	4.8	Hanoi
5	1,602	Techcombank	Banking	3.0	0.8	35.7	6.9	Hanoi
6	1,665	Asia Commercial Bank	Banking	2.7	0.7	29.6	4.3	Ho Chi Minh City
7	1,997	VPBank	Banking	3.9	0.5	33.2	6.0	Hanoi

== See also ==
- Economy of Vietnam
- List of companies of Vietnam
- List of largest companies by revenue
