= List of banks in Vietnam =

There are currently 49 banks in Vietnam, including the following banks: State Bank, joint stock commercial banks, joint venture banks, foreign bank branches in Vietnam and 100% foreign-owned banks.

== Social Policy Banks ==
Vietnamese name	English name	Trading Abbreviation	Charter capital (VND bil.)	Headquarters	Website
Ngân hàng Chính sách Xã hội Việt Nam	Vietnam Bank for Social Policies	VBSP	23,960.1	169 Dinh Duong, Thanh Liet Ward, Hanoi, Vietnam	https://vbsp.org.vn/
Ngân hàng Phát triển Việt Nam	Vietnam Development Bank	VDP	15,085	25A Cat Linh, O Cho Dua Ward, Hanoi, Vietnam	https://vdb.gov.vn/

== State-owned Commercial Banks ==
Vietnamese name	English name	Trading Abbreviation	Charter capital (VND bil.)	Headquarters	Website
Ngân hàng Nông nghiệp và Phát triển Nông thôn Việt Nam	Vietnam Bank for Agriculture and Rural Development	Agribank	51,615	2 Lang Ha, Giang Vo ward, Hanoi.	agribank.com.vn
Ngân hàng TNHH MTV Việt Nam Hiện Đại	Modern Bank of Vietnam Limited	MBV	0	3 Lieu Giai, Ngoc Ha Ward, Hanoi.	https://www.mbv.com.vn/
Ngân hàng Thương mại TNHH MTV Kỷ Nguyên Thịnh Vượng	Generation of Prosperity Sole Member Limited Commcercial Bank	GPBank	0	19 Ba Trieu, Cua Nam Ward, Hanoi.	https://www.gpbank.com.vn/
Ngân hàng Thương mại TNHH MTV Ngoại thương Công nghệ số	Vietcombank Neo Limited Bank	VCBNeo	0	10 Thien Quang, Hai Ba Trung Ward, Hanoi	https://www.vcbneo.com.vn/

== State-operated Commercial Banks ==
Vietnamese name	English name	Trading Abbreviation	Charter capital (VND bil.)	Headquarters	Website
Ngân hàng TMCP Việt Nam Thịnh vượng	Vietnam Prosperity Bank JSC	VPBank	79,339	VPBank Tower, 89 Lang Ha, Dong Da Ward, Hanoi	https://www.vpbank.com.vn/
Ngân hàng TMCP Kỹ thương Việt Nam	Vietnam Technological and Commercial Bank JSC	Techcombank	70,648	6 Quang Trung, Cua Nam Ward, Hanoi	https://techcombank.com/
Ngân hàng Thương mại Cổ phần Đầu tư và Phát triển Việt Nam	Bank for Investment and Development of Vietnam	BIDV	68,975	BIDV Tower, 194 Tran Quang Khai, Hoan Kiem Ward, Hanoi	bidv.com.vn
Ngân hàng Thương mại Cổ phần Ngoại thương Việt Nam	Joint Stock Commercial Bank for Foreign Trade of Vietnam	Vietcombank	55,892	198 Tran Quang Khai, Hoan Kiem Ward, Hanoi	vietcombank.com.vn
Ngân hàng Thương mại Cổ phần Công thương Việt Nam	Vietnam Bank for Industry and Trade	Vietinbank	53,699	108 Tran Hung Dao, Cua Nam Ward, Hanoi	vietinbank.vn
Ngân hàng TMCP Quân đội	Military Bank JSC	MB	53,063	MB Grand Tower, 63 Le Van Luong, Yen Hoa Ward, Hanoi	https://www.mbbank.com.vn/
Ngân hàng TMCP Á Châu	Asia Commercial Bank JSC	ACB	44,666	442 Nguyen Thi Minh Khai, Ban Co Ward, Ho Chi Minh City	https://acb.com.vn/
Ngân hàng TMCP Sài Gòn - Hà Nội	Saigon - Hanoi Bank JSC	SHB	38,073	77 Tran Hung Dao, Cua Nam Ward, Hanoi	https://www.shb.com.vn/
Ngân hàng TMCP Phát triển TP.HCM	Ho Chi Minh City Development Bank JSC	HDBank	35,101	25Bis Nguyen Thi Minh Khai, Sai Gon Ward, Ho Chi Minh City	https://hdbank.com.vn/
Ngân hàng TMCP Quốc tế Việt Nam	Vietnam International Bank JSC	VIB	29,791	111A Pasteur, Sai Gon Ward, Ho Chi Minh City	https://www.vib.com.vn/vn/home
Ngân hàng TMCP Đông Nam Á	Southeast Asia Bank JSC	SeABank	28,350	BRG Tower, 198 Tran Quang Khai, Hoan Kiem Ward, Hanoi	https://www.seabank.com.vn/
Ngân hàng TMCP Tiên phong	Tien Phong Bank JSC	TPBank	26,419	TPBank Tower, 57 Ly Thuong Kiet, Cua Nam Ward, Hanoi	https://tpb.vn/ca-nhan
Ngân hàng TMCP Hàng hải Việt Nam	Vietnam Maritime Bank JSC	MSB	26,000	54A Nguyen Chi Thanh, Lang Ward, Hanoi	https://www.msb.com.vn/vi/ca-nhan
Ngân hàng TMCP Lộc Phát Việt Nam	Fortune Vietnam Commercial Bank JSC	LPBank	25,576	8/1 Ton Duc Thang, Hoa Lu Ward, Ninh Binh	https://lpbank.com.vn/
Ngân hàng TMCP Phương Đông	Orient Commercial Bank JSC	OCB	24,657	The Hallmark, 15 Tran Bach Dang, An Khanh Ward, Ho Chi Minh City	https://www.ocb.com.vn/vi/ca-nhan
Ngân hàng TMCP Sài Gòn	Saigon Commercial Bank JSC	SCB	20,020	242 Cong Quynh, Ben Thanh Ward, Ho Chi Minh City	https://www.scb.com.vn/
Ngân hàng TMCP Sài Gòn Tài Lộc	Saigon Treasure Commercial Bank JSC	Sacombank	18,852	43-45-47 Nguyen Thi Minh Khai, Sai Gon Ward, Ho Chi Minh City	https://www.sacombank.com.vn/ca-nhan.html
Ngân hàng TMCP Xuất Nhập khẩu Việt Nam	Vietnam Export-Import Commercial Bank JSC	Eximbank	18,688	27-29 Ly Thai To, Hoan Kiem Ward, Ho Chi Minh City	https://eximbank.com.vn/
Ngân hàng TMCP Nam Á	Nam A Bank JSC	Nam A Bank	13,725	Nam A Bank Tower, 201-203 Cach Mang Thang Tam, Ban Co Ward, Ho Chi Minh City	https://www.namabank.com.vn/
Ngân hàng TMCP Quốc dân	National Citizen Bank JSC	NCB	11,779	25 Le Dai Hanh, Hai Ba Trung Ward, Hanoi	https://www.ncb-bank.vn/
Ngân hàng TMCP An Bình	An Binh Bank JSC	ABBank	10,350	Geleximco Tower, 36 Hoang Cau, O Cho Dua Ward., Hanoi Capital	https://www.abbank.vn/
Ngân hàng TMCP Đại chúng Việt Nam	Vietnam Public Commercial Bank JSC	PVComBank	9,000	22 Ngo Quyen, Cua Nam Ward, Hanoi	https://www.pvcombank.com.vn/
Ngân hàng TMCP Bắc Á	Bac A Bank JSC	Bac A Bank	8,959	117 Quang Trung, Thanh Vinh Ward, Nghe An	https://www.baca-bank.vn/
Ngân hàng TMCP Việt Nam Thương Tín	Viet Nam Thuong Tin Bank JSC	VietBank	7,139	47 Tran Hung Dao, Phu Loi Ward, Can Tho	https://www.vietbank.com.vn/
Ngân hàng TMCP Bản Việt	Viet Capital Bank JSC / Ban Viet Bank JSC	BVBank	5,518	412 Nguyen Thi Minh Khai, Ban Co Ward, Ho Chi Minh City	https://bvbank.net.vn/
Ngân hàng TMCP Việt Á	Viet A Bank JSC	VAB	5,400	105 Chu Văn An, Ha Dong Ward, Ha Tay	https://vietabank.com.vn/
Ngân hàng TNHH MTV Số Vikki	Vikki Digital Bank Limited	Vikki Bank	0	72 Ly Thuong Kiet, Cua Nam Ward, Hanoi.	https://vikkibank.vn/
Ngân hàng TMCP Thịnh vượng & Phát triển	Prosperity and Growth Bank JSC	PGBank	4,200	Thanh Cong building, P-D17 lot, Cau Giay urban complex, Cau Giay Ward, Hanoi	https://www.pgbank.com.vn/
Ngân hàng TMCP Kiên Long	Kien Long Bank JSC	KLB	3,652	40-42-44 Pham Hong Thai, Rach Gia Ward, An Giang	https://kienlongbank.com/
Ngân hàng TMCP Sài Gòn Công Thương	Saigon Bank for Industry and Trade JSC	SaigonBank/SGB	3,388	2C Pho Duc Chinh, Ben Thanh Ward, Ho Chi Minh City	https://www.saigonbank.com.vn/
Ngân hàng TMCP Bảo Việt	Bao Viet Bank JSC	Baoviet	3,150	16 Phan Chu Trinh, Cua Nam Ward, Hanoi	https://www.baovietbank.vn/

== Branch of Foreign Banks in Vietnam ==
Vietnamese name	English name	Country	Headquarters
Ngân hàng TNHH MTV Shinhan Việt Nam	Shinhan Bank Vietnam	South Korea	The MeTT Tower, 15 Tran Bach Dang, Thu Duc City, HCMC
Ngân hàng TNHH MTV HSBC Việt Nam	HSBC Vietnam	United Kingdom	Metropolitan Tower, 235 Đồng Khởi Street, District 1, HCMC
Ngân hàng TNHH MTV Standard Chartered Việt Nam	Standard Chartered Vietnam	United Kingdom	Capital Place, 29 Lieu Giai, Ba Dinh Dist., Hanoi Capital
Ngân hàng TNHH MTV Woori Bank tại Việt Nam	WooriBank Vietnam	South Korea	Keangnam Landmark72, E6 Pham Hung, Nam Tu Liem Dist., Hanoi Capital
Ngân hàng TNHH MTV CIMB Bank Việt Nam	CIMB Vietnam	Malaysia	The Hallmark, 15 Tran Bach Dang, Thu Duc City, HCMC
Ngân hàng TNHH MTV Public Bank Việt Nam	Public Bank Vietnam	Malaysia	Hanoi Tungshing Square Tower, 2 Ngo Quyen, Hoan Kiem Dist., Hanoi Capital
Chi nhánh Ngân hàng TNHH MTV Hong Leong Bank tại Việt Nam	Hong Leong Bank Vietnam	Malaysia	Centec Tower, 72-74 Nguyen Thi Minh Khai, District 3, HCMC
Ngân hàng TNHH MTV UOB Việt Nam	UOB Vietnam	Singapore	Central Plaza Building, 71 Le Duan, District 1, HCMC
Ngân hàng Đại chúng TNHH Kasikornbank Việt Nam	KBank Vietnam	Thailand	Sunwah Tower, 115 Nguyen Hue, District 1, HCMC
Chi nhánh Ngân hàng Đại chúng TNHH Bangkok Bank tại Việt Nam	Bangkok Bank Vietnam	Thailand	Harbour View Tower, 35 Nguyen Hue, District 1, HCMC
Chi nhánh Ngân hàng Deutsche Bank tại Việt Nam	Deutsche Bank AG Vietnam Branch	Germany	Deutsches Haus Tower, 33 Le Duan, District 1, HCMC
