= Bến Thành =

Bến Thành Phường Bến Thành
- Ward
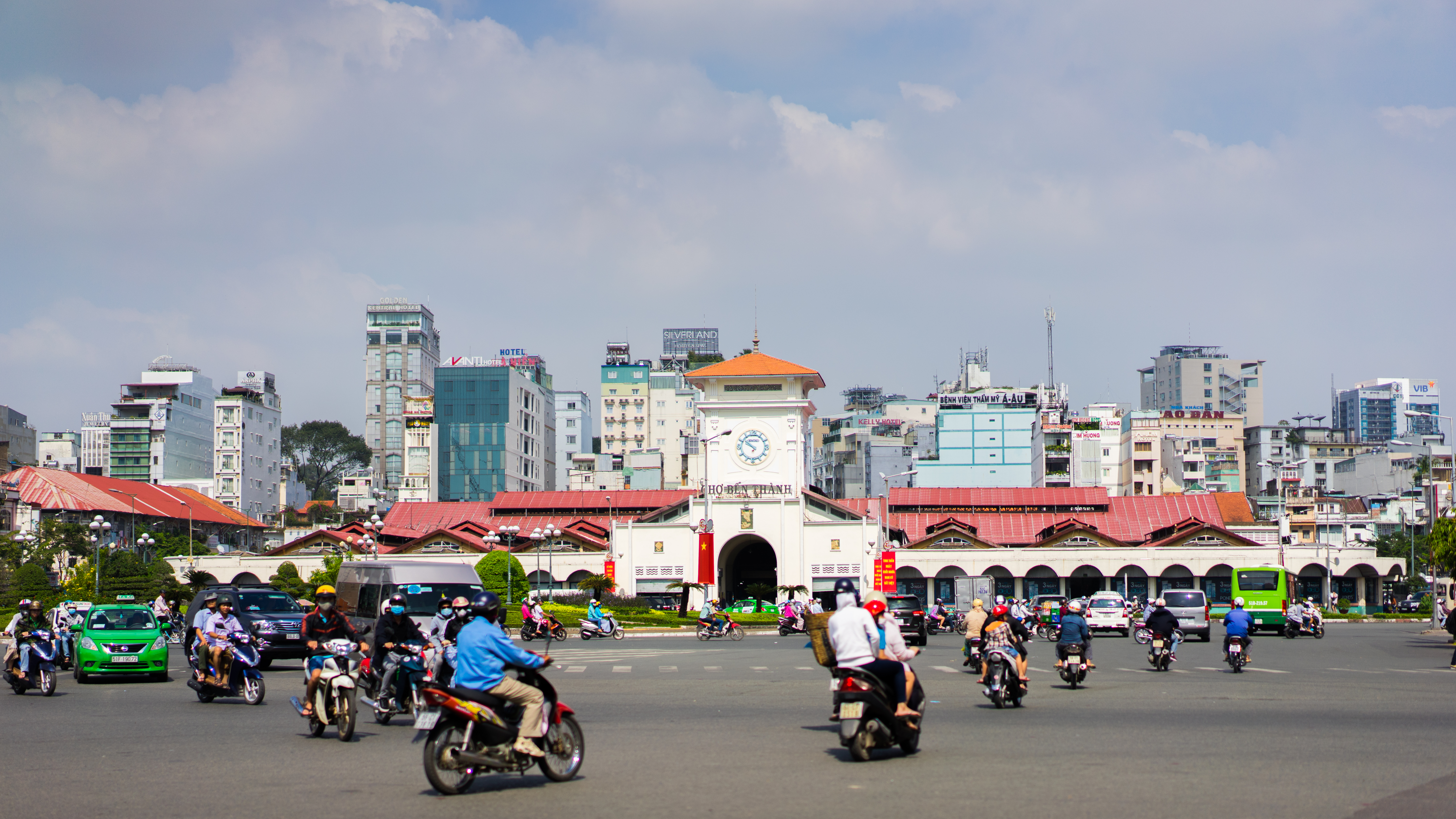
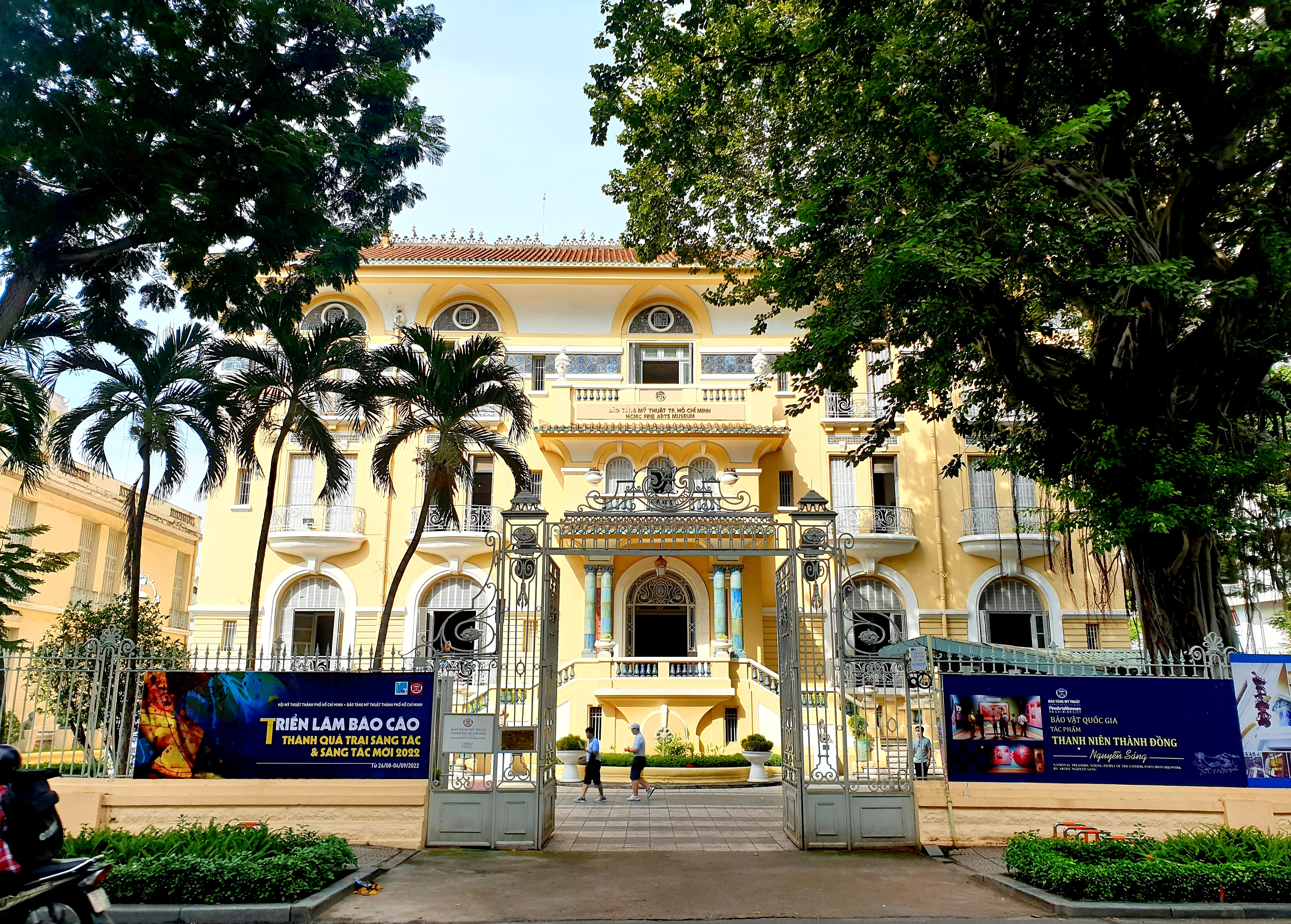
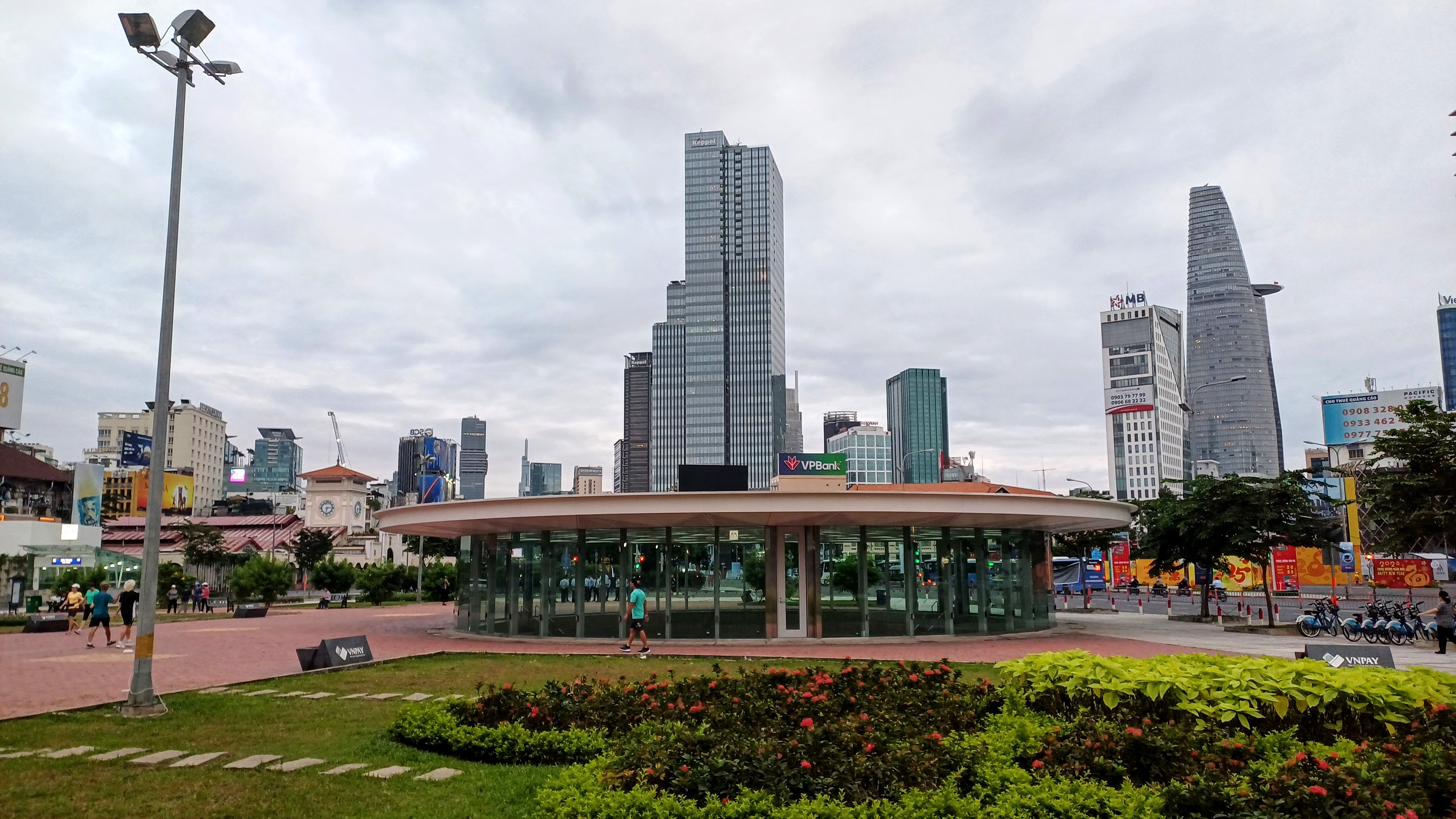
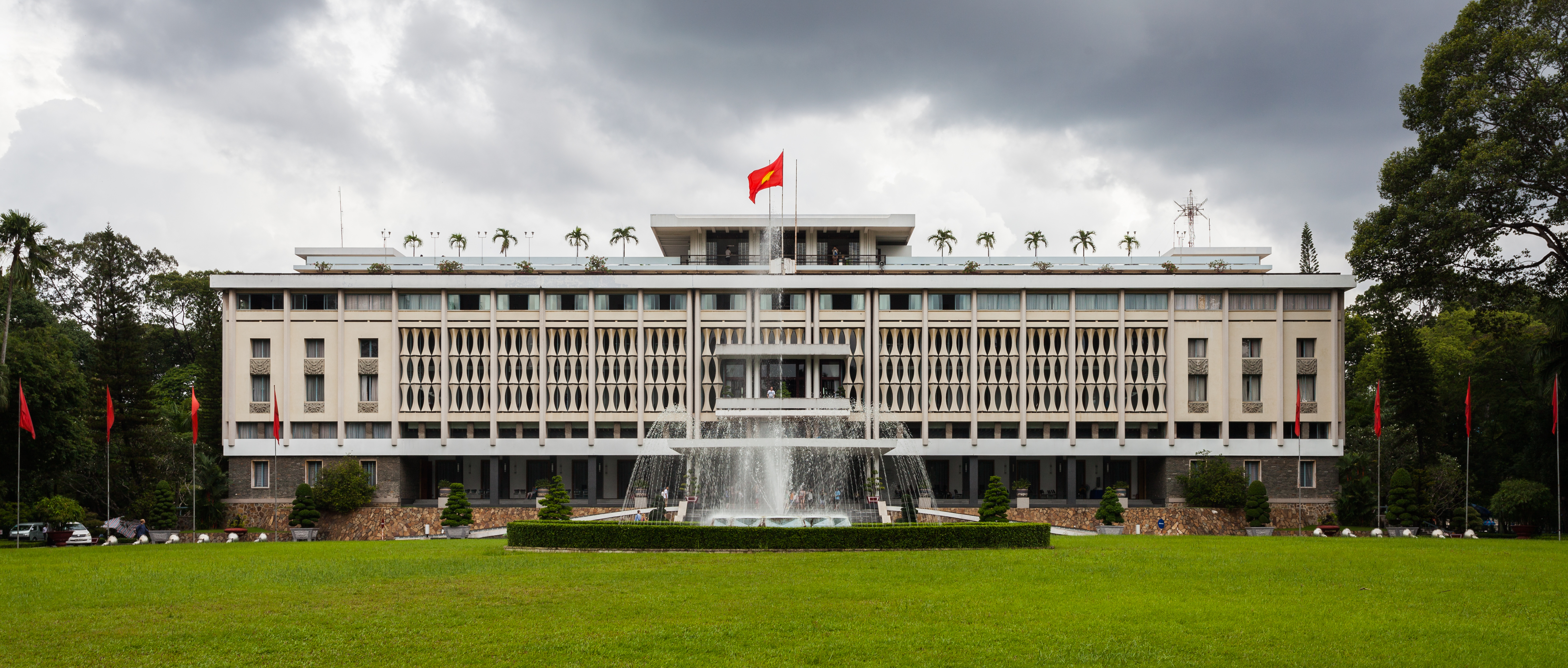
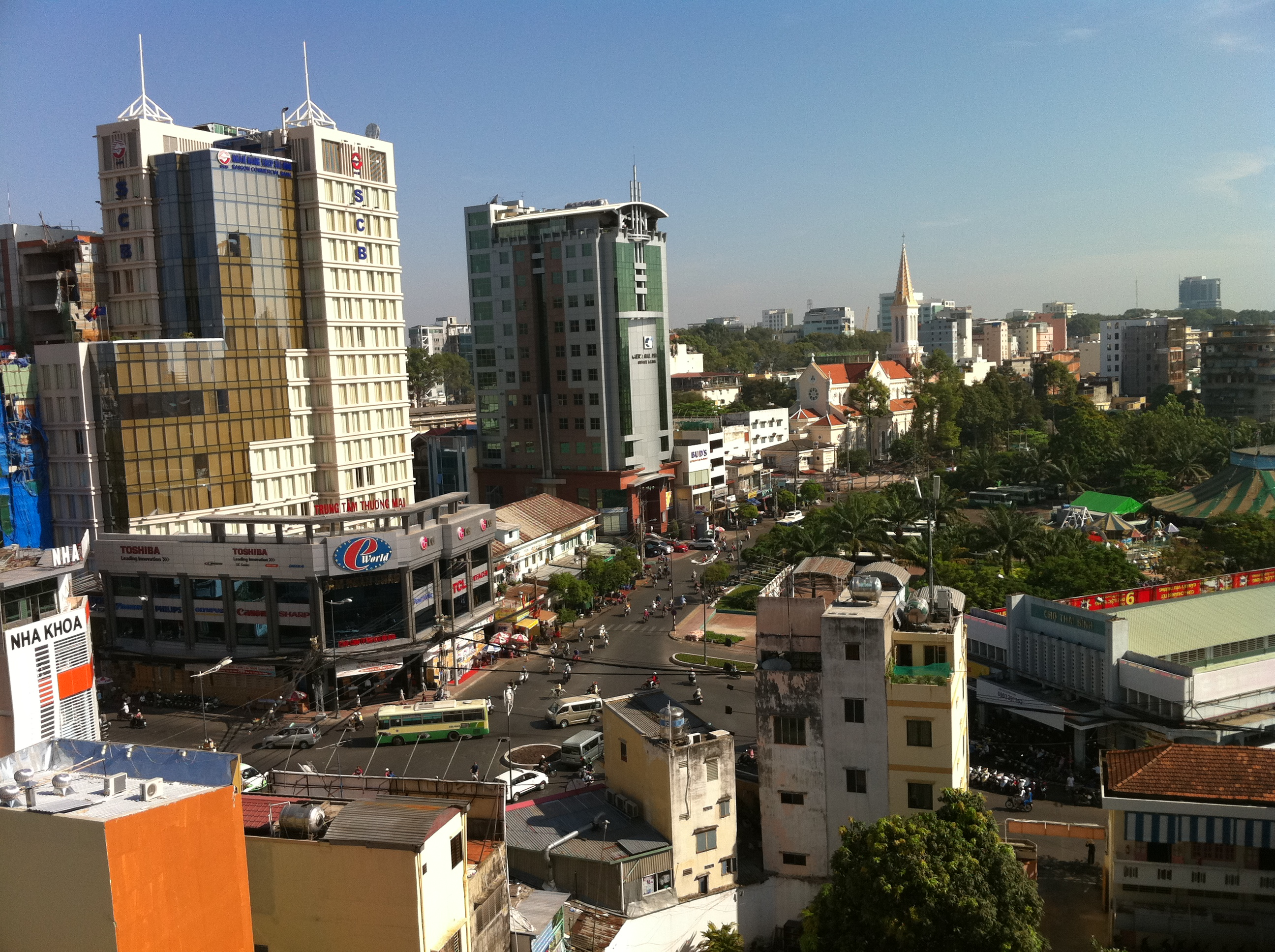
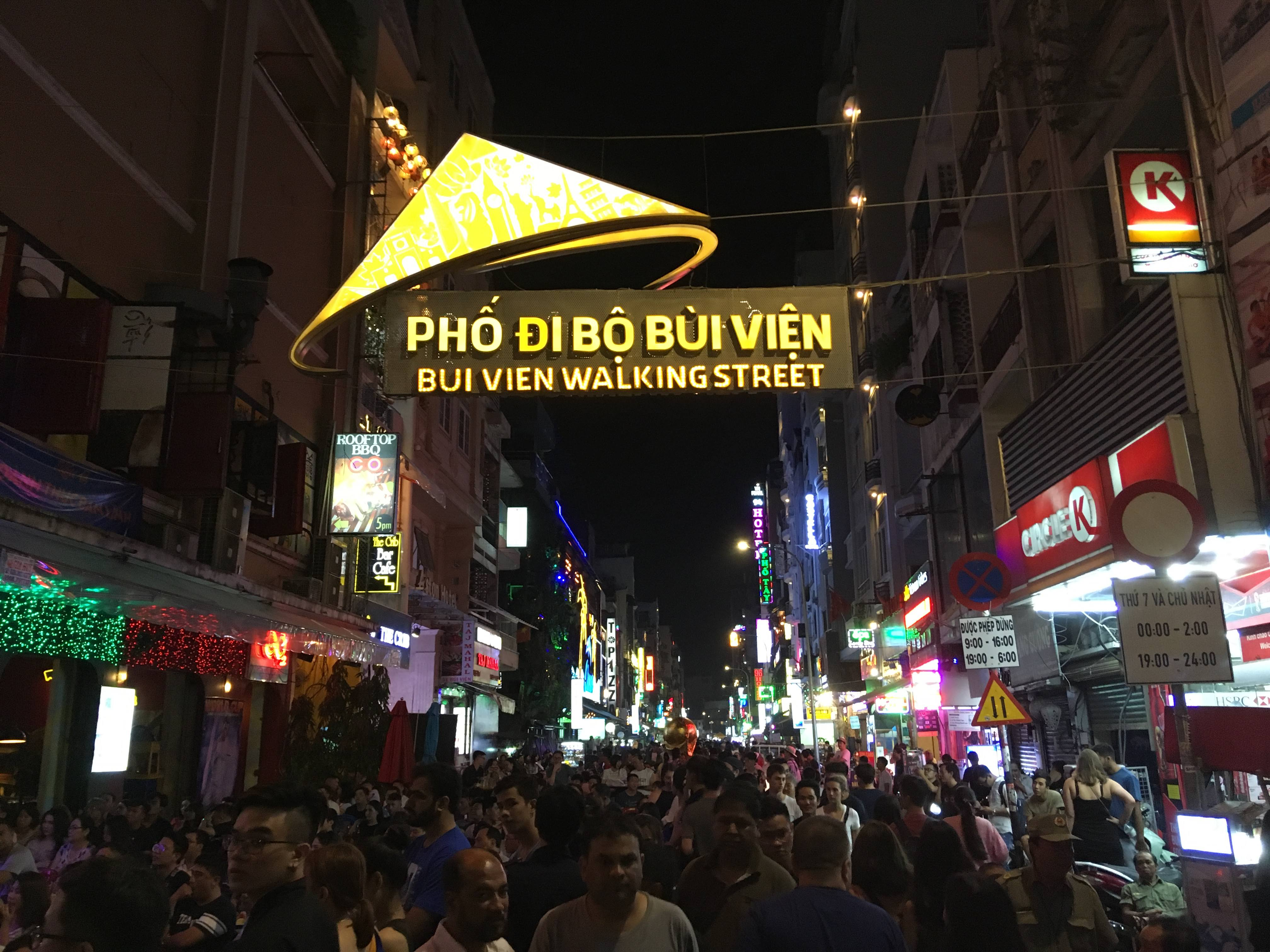
- Clockwise from top: Bến Thành Market and Quách Thị Trang Square, Ben Thanh station at September 23 Park, Independence Palace, Bùi Viện Street – Backpacker quarter, Thái Bình Market Roundabout area, Ho Chi Minh City Museum of Fine Arts
- Interactive map of Bến Thành
- Coordinates: 10°46′13″N 106°41′39″E
- Country: Vietnam
- Municipality: Ho Chi Minh City
- Established: June 16, 2025

Area
  - Total: 0.71 sq mi (1.85 km^{2})

Population (2024)
  - Total: 71,785
  - Density: 100,000/sq mi (38,800/km^{2})
- Time zone: UTC+07:00 (Indochina Time)
- Administrative code: 26743
- Website: phuongbenthanh.gov.vn

Bến Thành (Vietnamese: Phường Bến Thành) is a ward of Ho Chi Minh City, Vietnam. It is one of the 168 new wards, communes and special zones of the city following the reorganization in 2025.

== Etymology ==
Some claims suggest that the term ‘Bến Thành’ came from the name of a wharf overlooking the Bến Nghé River (modern-day Saigon River; not the canal of the same name) which offered ferry services entering the Citadel of Saigon, hence the name Bến Thành (lit. citadel wharf). This hypothesis was backed up by toponymologist and author Lê Trung Hoa.

It is also the name of a market, known as Bến Thành market, whose old, previous location is now known as Tôn Thất Đạm Market or the Old Market (Chợ cũ) and around Nguyễn Huệ Boulevard and Hàm Nghi Boulevard. In the 19th century, the market was eventually moved to its current location and given the alias: New Market (Chợ mới).

== Geography ==
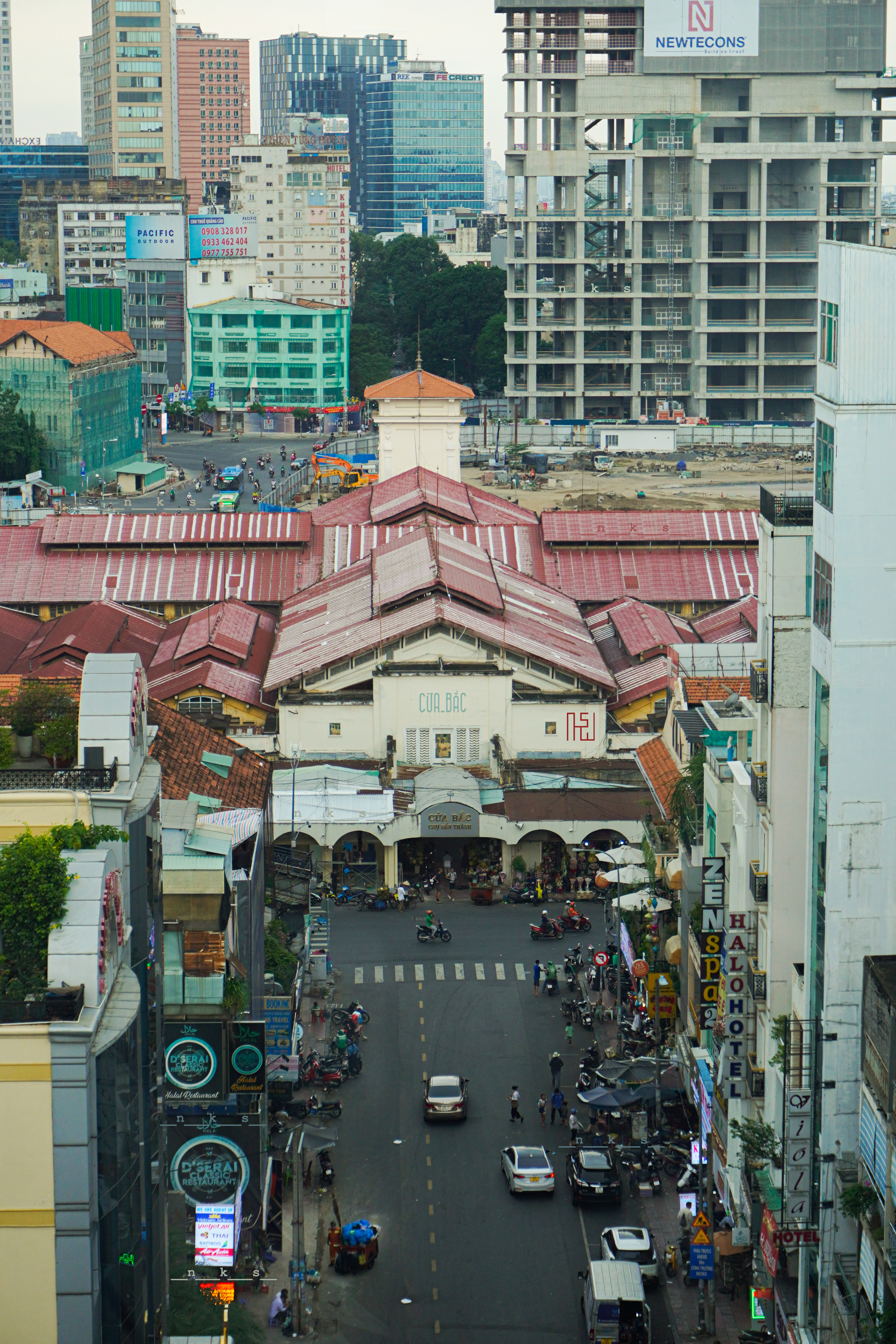
A view of Bến Thành Ward from Nesta Saigon Hotel on Thủ Khoa Huân Street, opposite the North Gate (Cửa Bắc) of Bến Thành Market

Bến Thành ward is located at the city centre, adjacent to:

- Khánh Hội and Xóm Chiếu wards to the southeast by Bến Nghé Channel
- Saigon ward to the northeast by Nam Kỳ Khởi Nghĩa Street
- Bàn Cờ and Xuân Hòa wards to the west by đường Nguyễn Thị Minh Khai Street
- Cầu Ông Lãnh ward to the south by routes of Cống Quỳnh – Nguyễn Cư Trinh – Trần Hưng Đạo – Nguyễn Thái Học.

According to Official Dispatch No. 2896/BNV-CQĐP dated May 27, 2025 of the Ministry of Home Affairs, following the merger, Bến Thành has a land area of 1.85 km², the population as of December 31, 2024 is 71,785 people, the population density is 38,802 people/km².

== History ==
Before 1975, Bến Thành was a ward of the 2nd district, City of Saigon.

After 1975, Bến Thành ward annexed with Nhà thờ Huyện Sĩ ward (Huyện Sĩ Church) to become Huyện Sĩ ward. However, until 1976, District 2 was merged into District 1, Huyện Sĩ ward dissolved into Wards 11, 12 and 13 of District 1.

28 December 1988, The Council of Ministers issued Decision No.184-HĐBT, all of natural area and population of Ward 11 and Ward 12 were merged to re-establish Bến Thành Ward.

On 16 June 2025, the Standing Committee of the National Assembly issued Resolution No. 1685/NQ-UBTVQH15. Accordingly, Bến Thành Ward (new) was formed after arranging the entire area and population of Bến Thành Ward, Phạm Ngũ Lão Ward and part of the natural area and population size of Cầu Ông Lãnh Ward, Nguyễn Thái Bình Ward. This Resolution takes effect from the date of issuance.

== Notable attractions ==
=== Public area ===
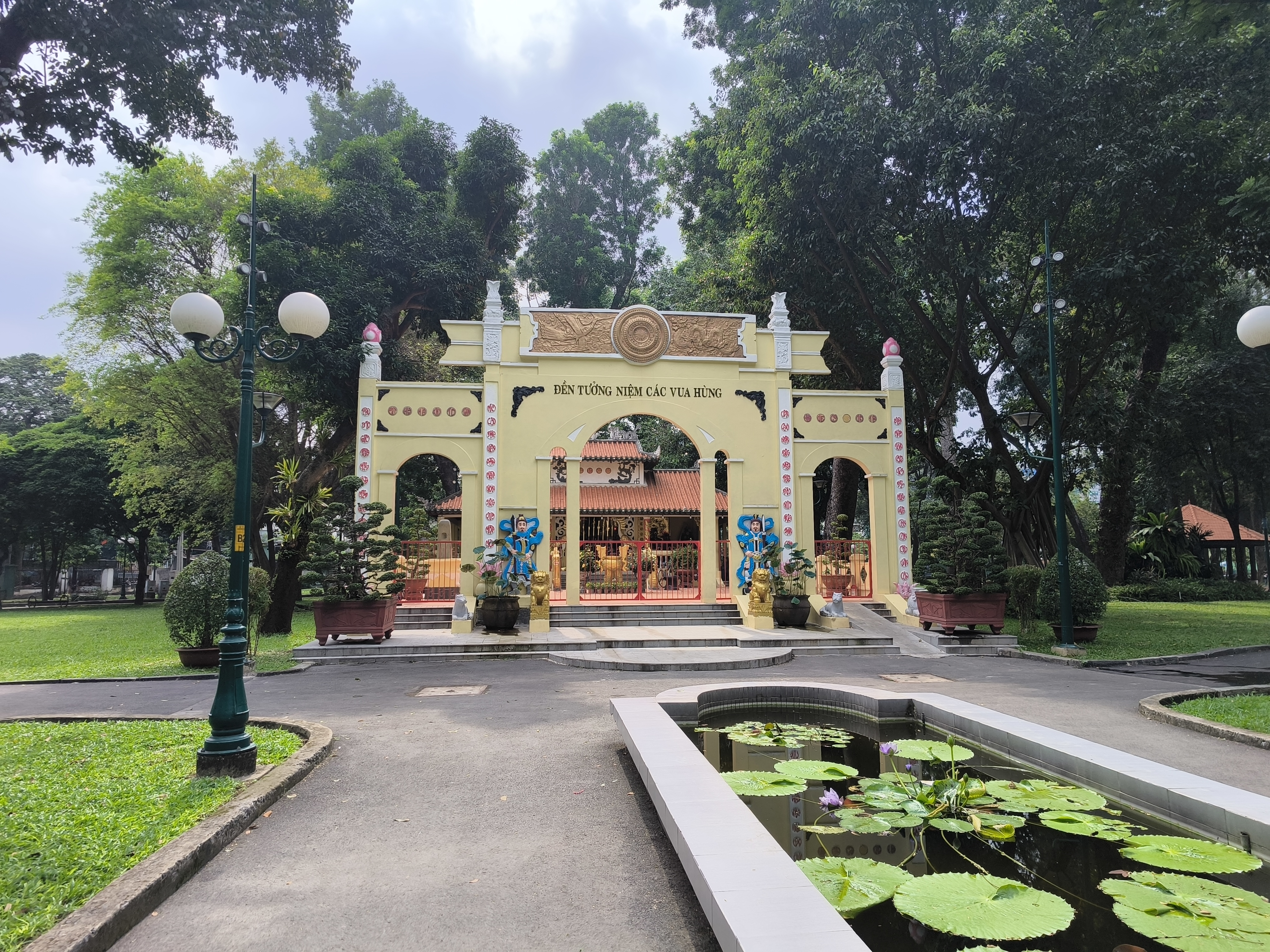
Tao Đàn Park with Hùng kings Temple inside

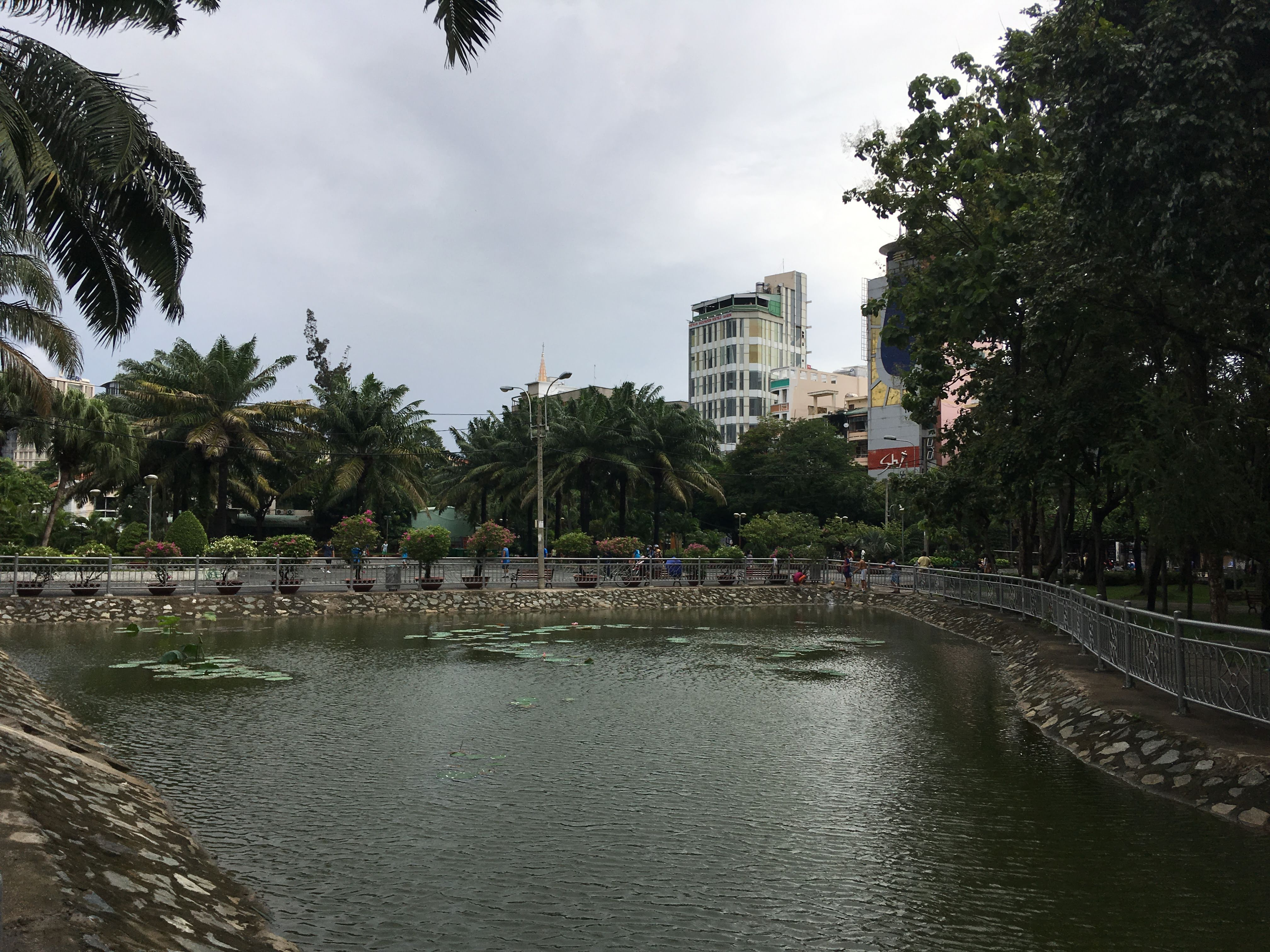
September 23rd Park with a central pond

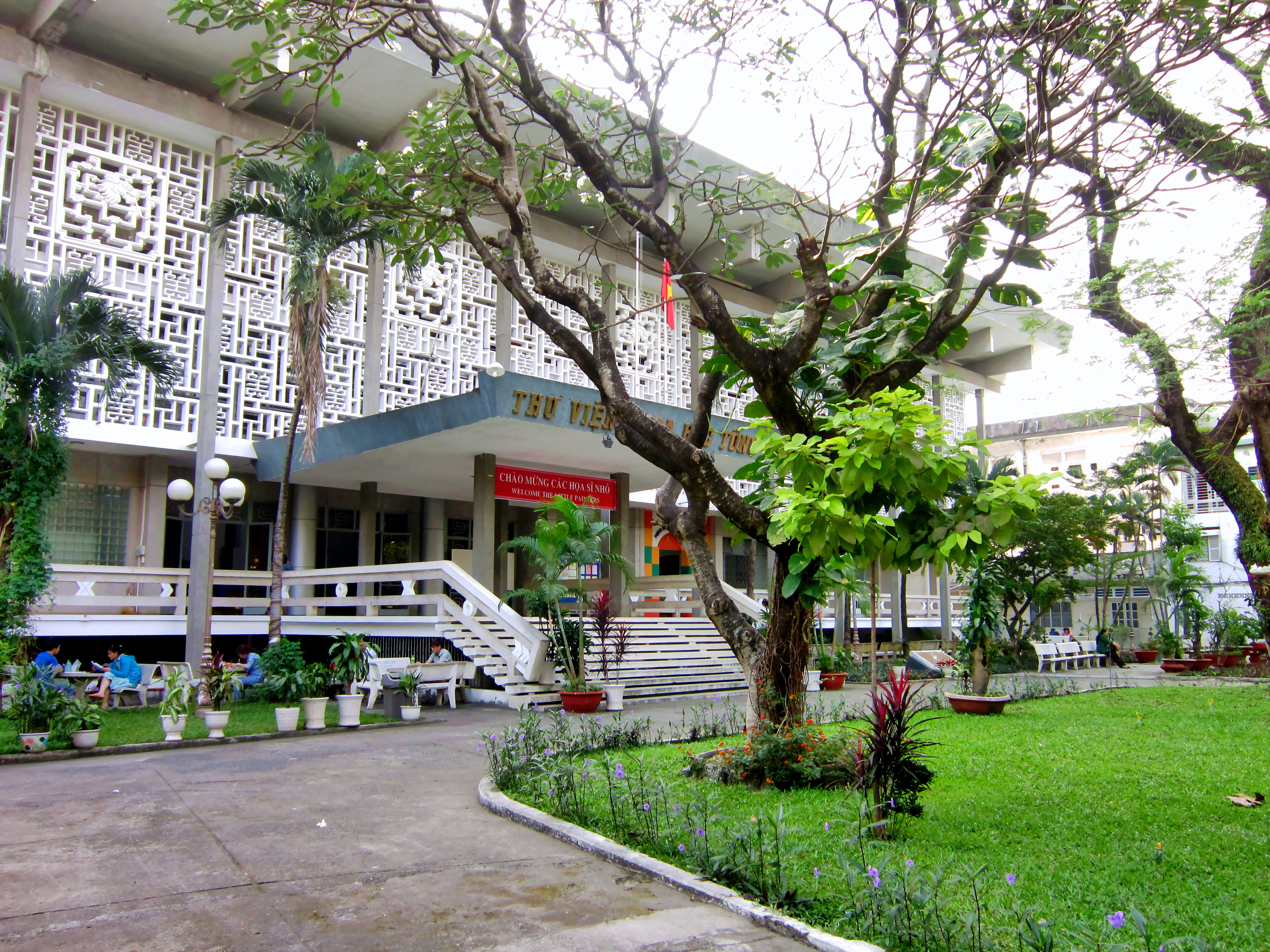
General Sciences Library of Ho Chi Minh City (Originally was place of Maison Centrale de Saigon)

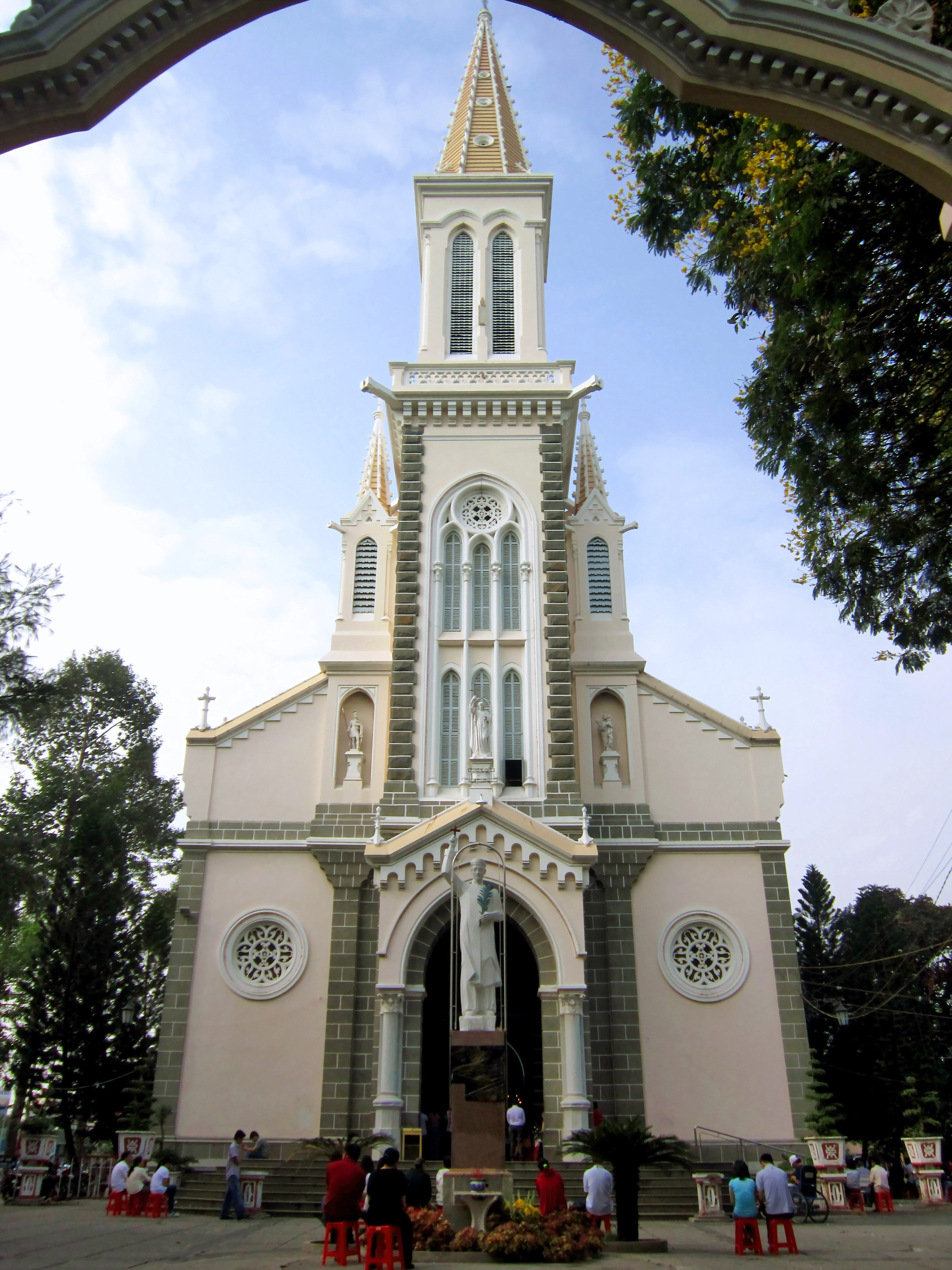
Huyện Sỹ Church on corner of Lê Lai – Tôn Thất Tùng Street [vi] (Officially known as Saint-Philippe Church. Originally known as Chợ Đũi Church as it is in the Chợ Đũi area)

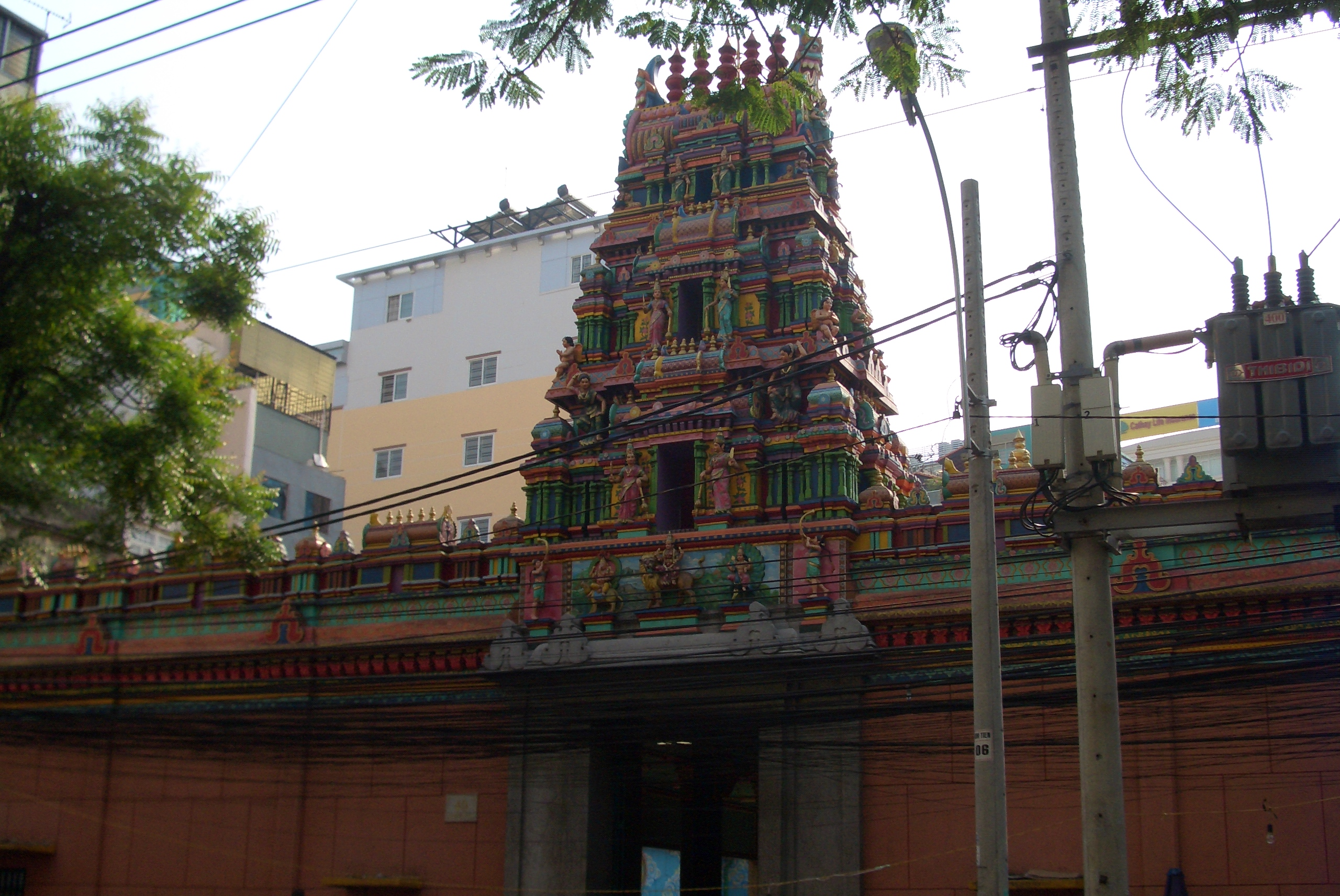
Mariamman Temple, Ho Chi Minh City on Trương Định Street

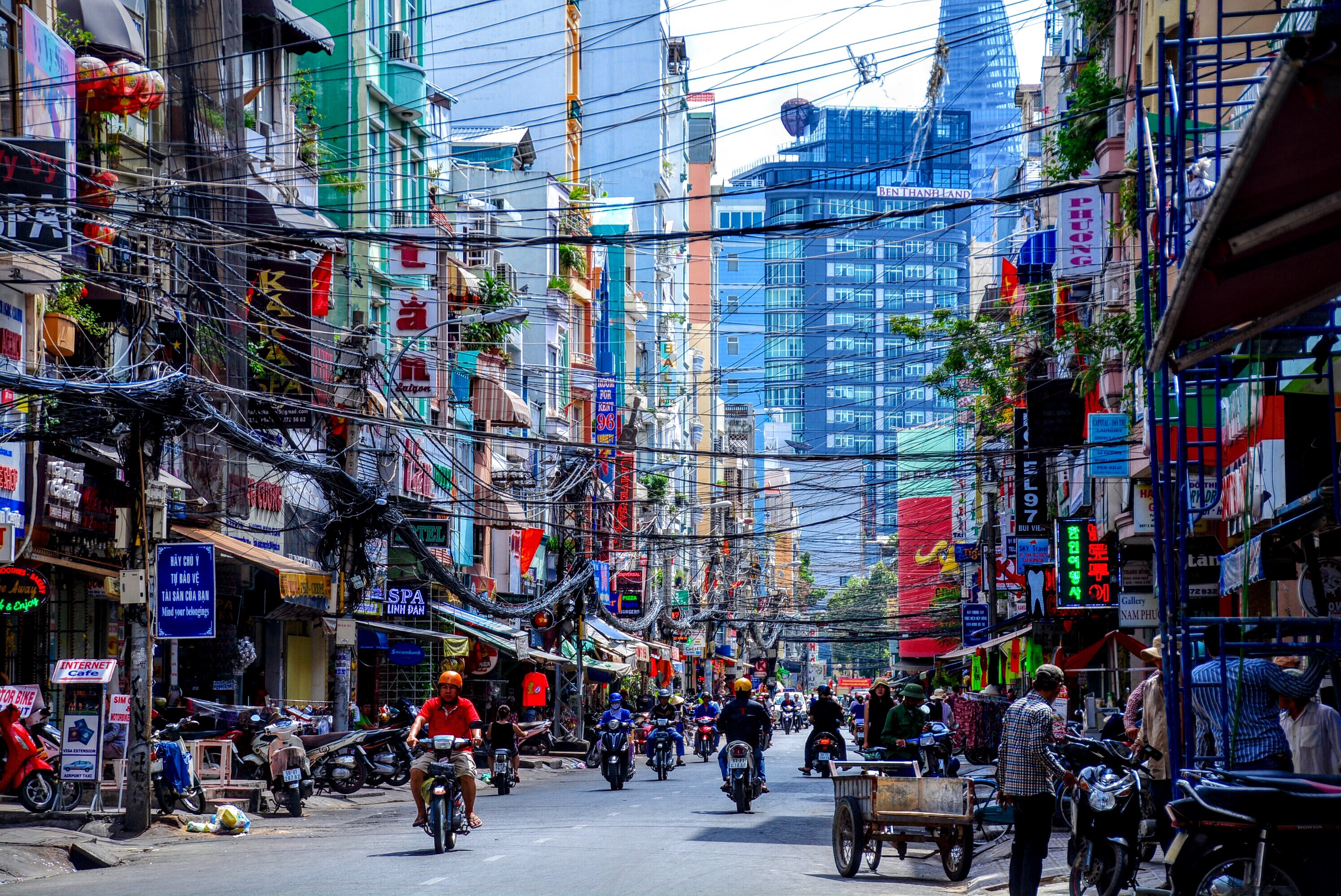
Bùi Viện Street – Backpacker district

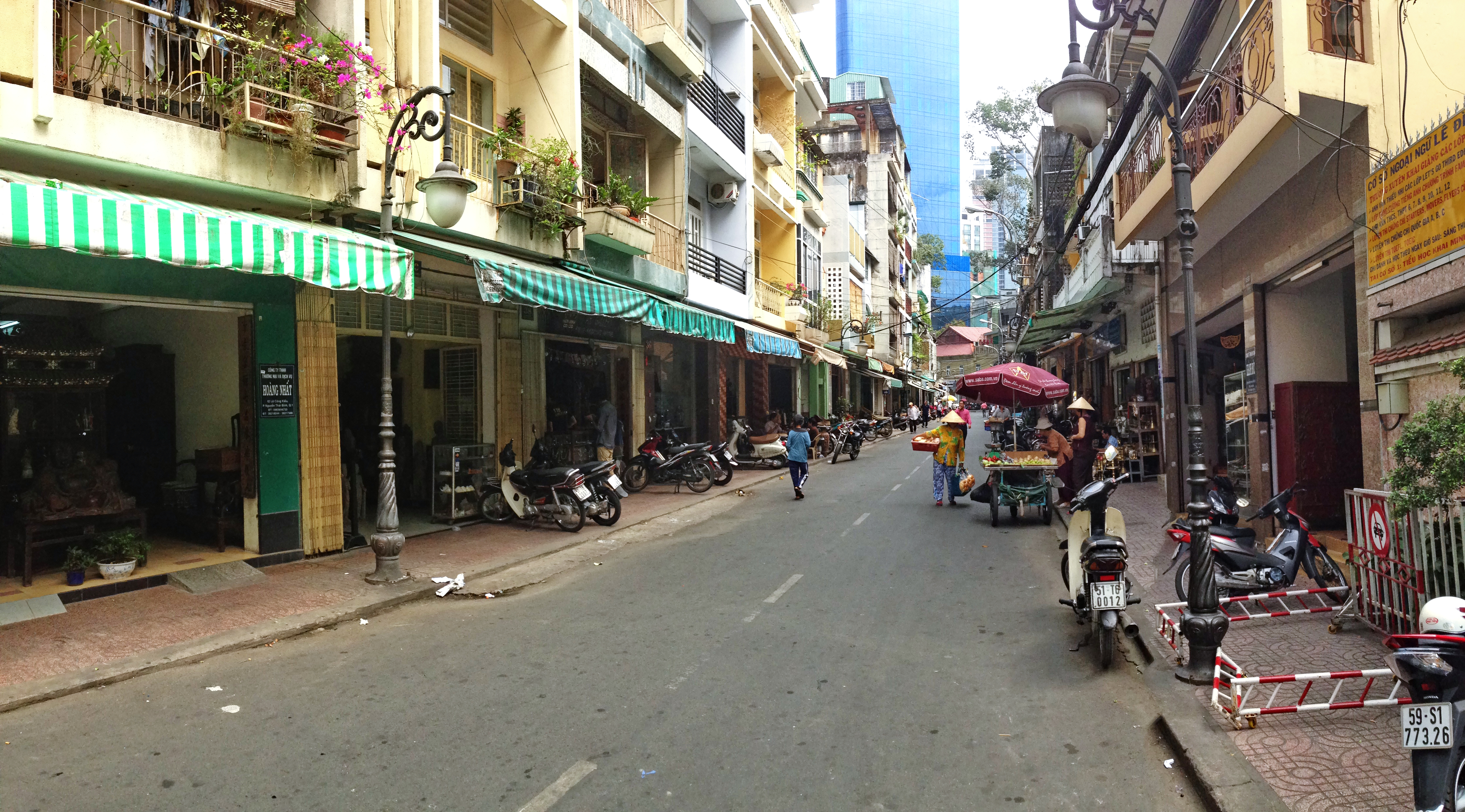
Lê Công Kiều Street – Antique district

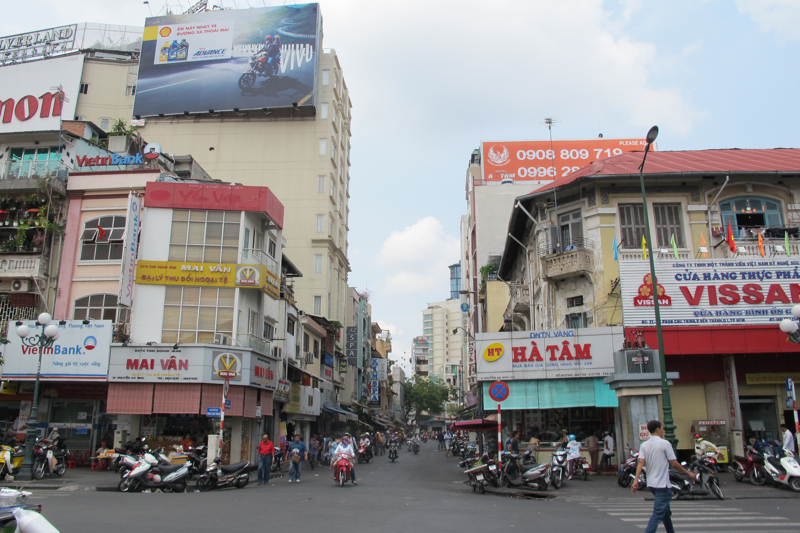
Shophouses with mostly are foreign exchange agencies on Phan Châu Trinh Street and a small Halal district on Nguyễn An Ninh Street (West Gate of Bến Thành Market area)

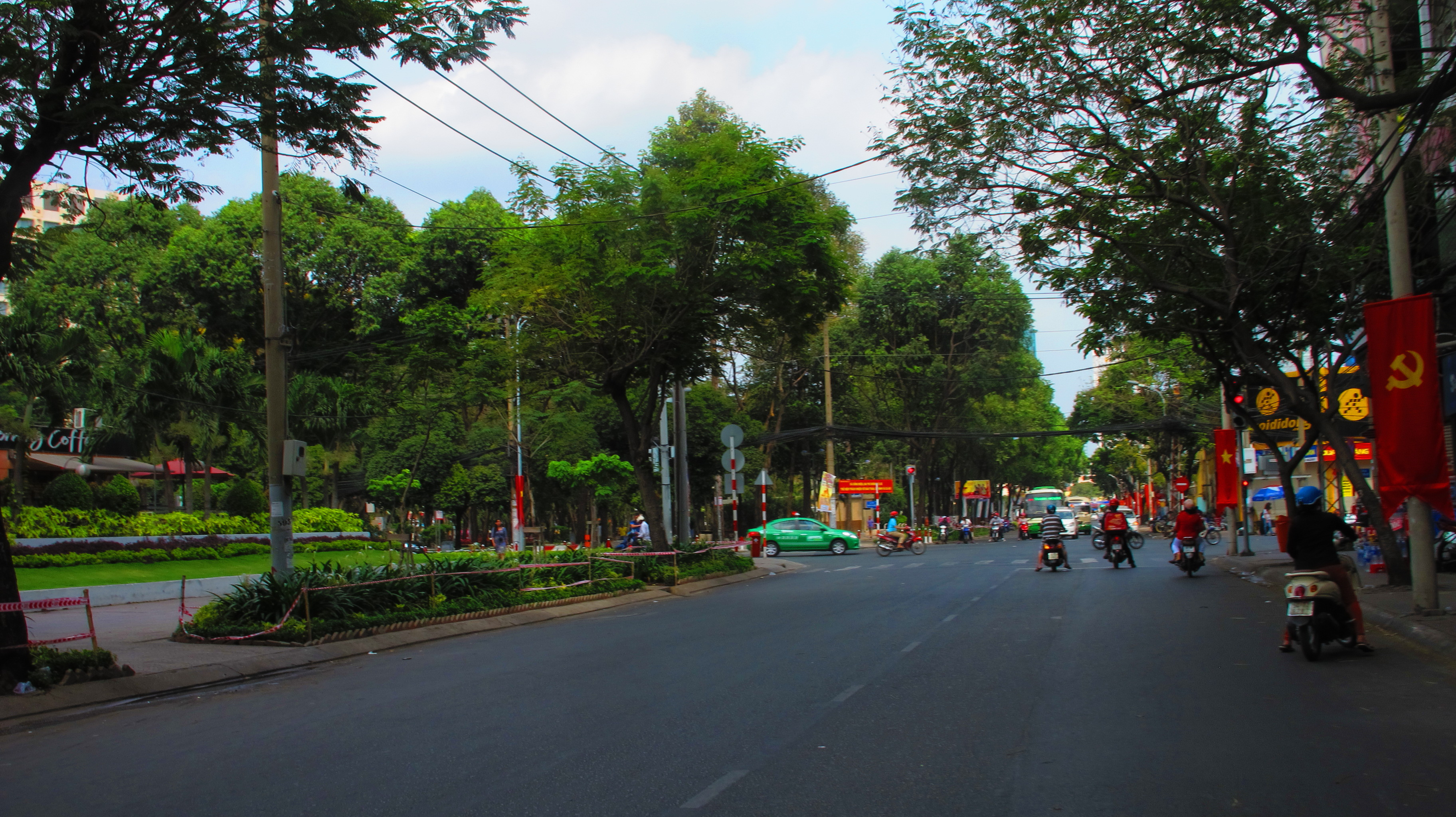
Phạm Ngũ Lão Street run along the September 23 Park

=== Notable buildings ===
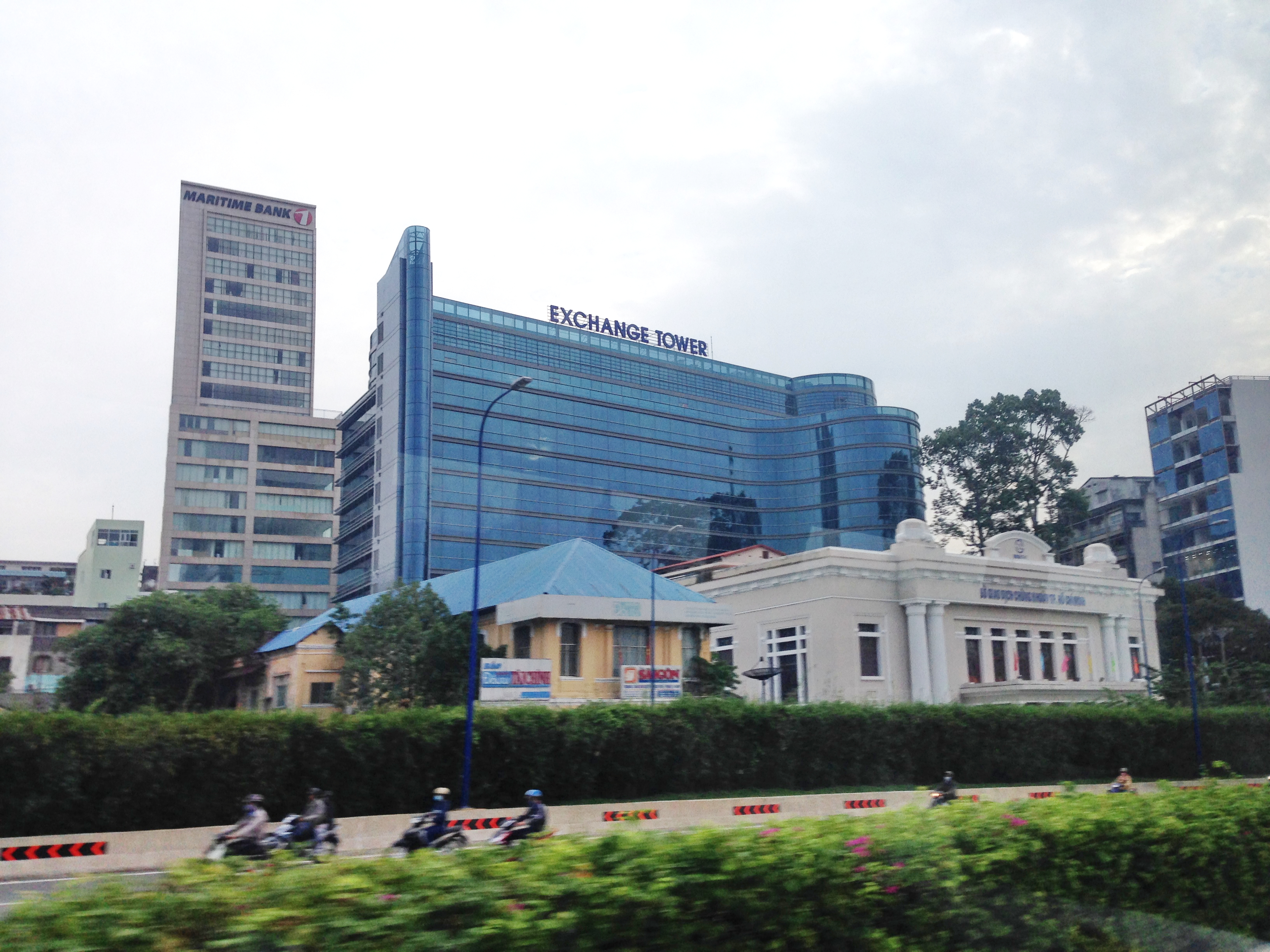
Ho Chi Minh Stock Exchange Tower (Blue) with ROX Tower (Left; originally Maritime Bank Tower then TNR Tower)

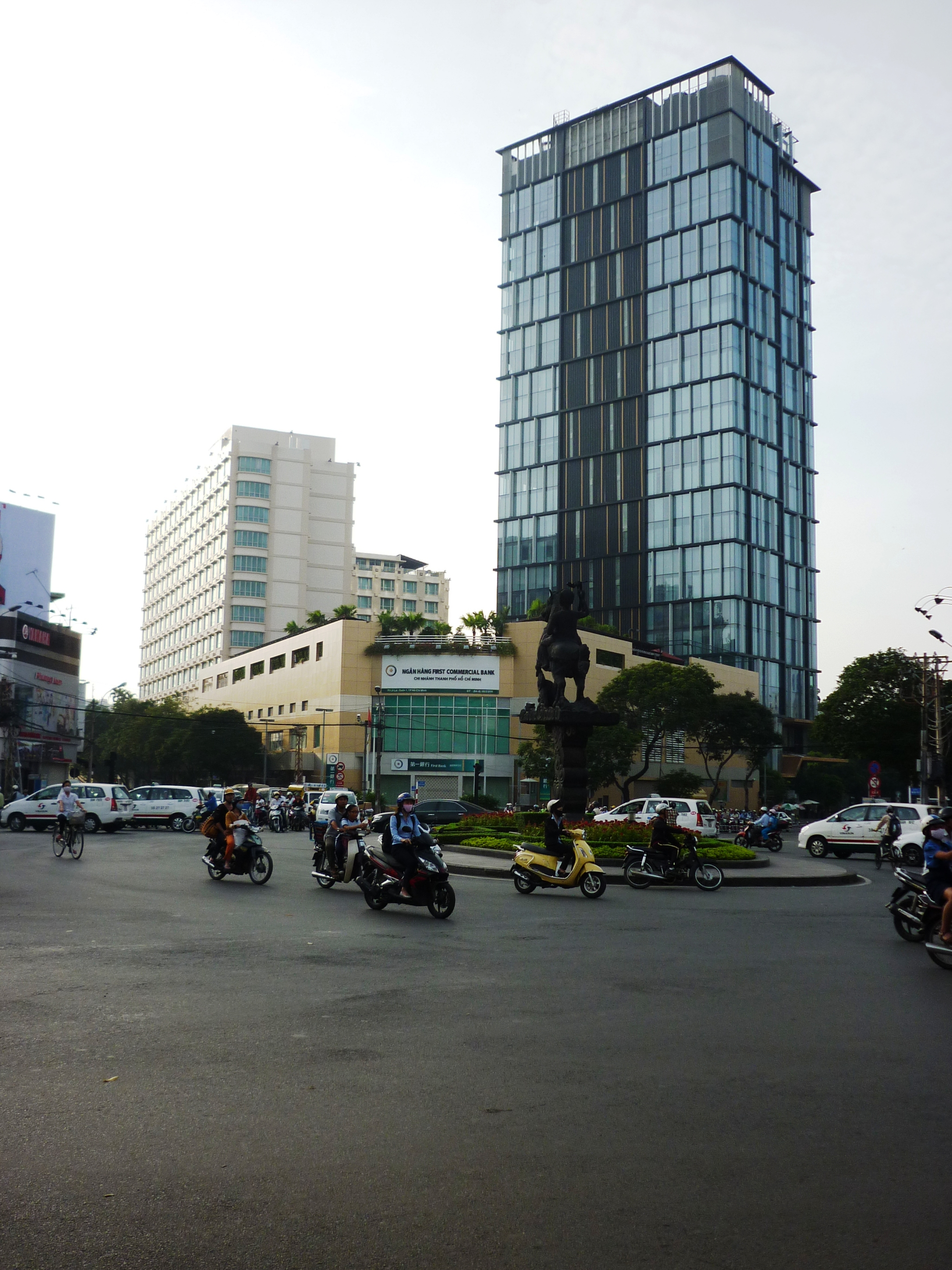
New World Saigon Hotel with AB Tower (taller one)

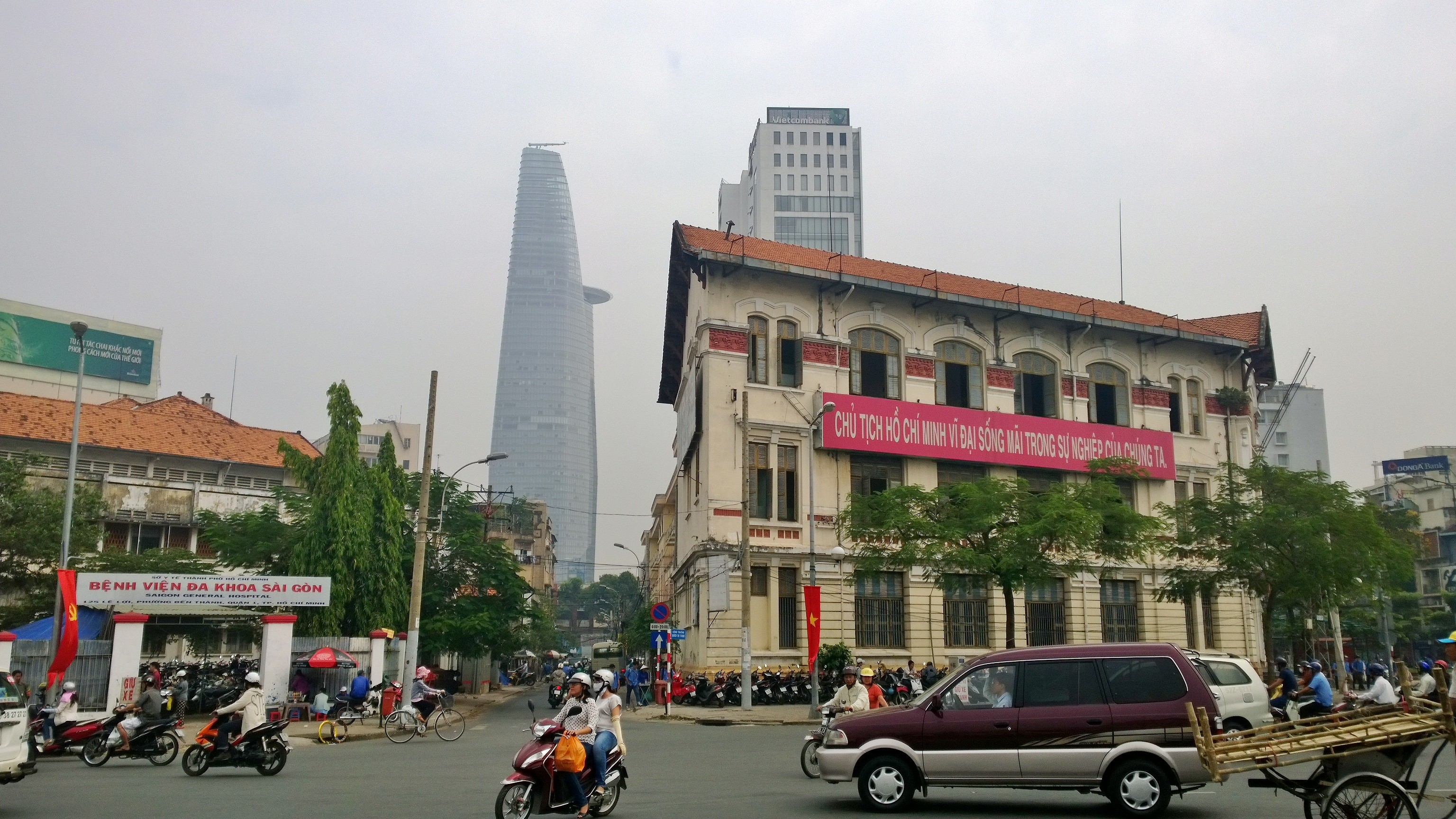
Saigon General Hospotal (Left) with Saigon Railway Transport JSC Building (Right)

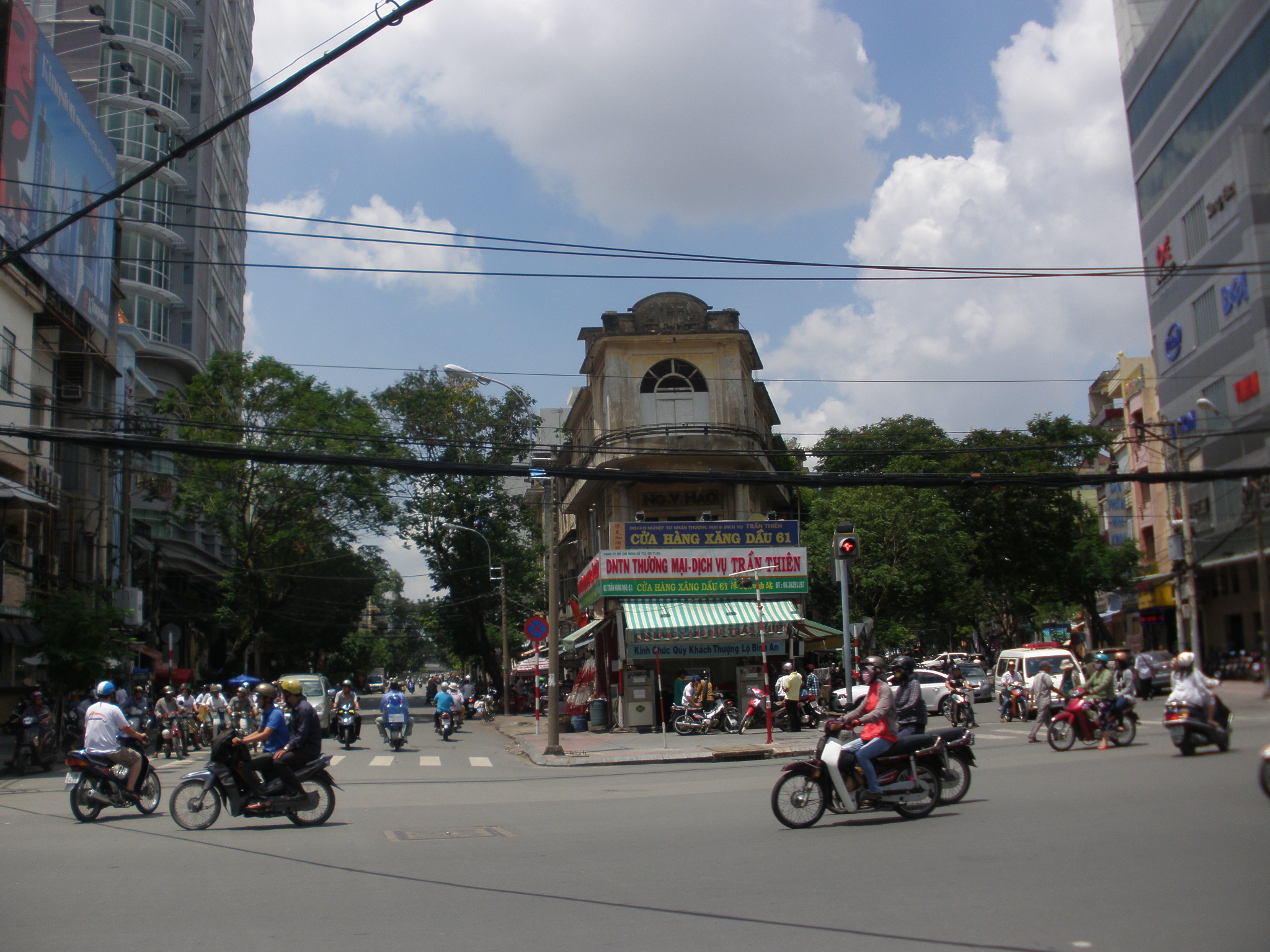
Nguyễn Văn Hảo Building

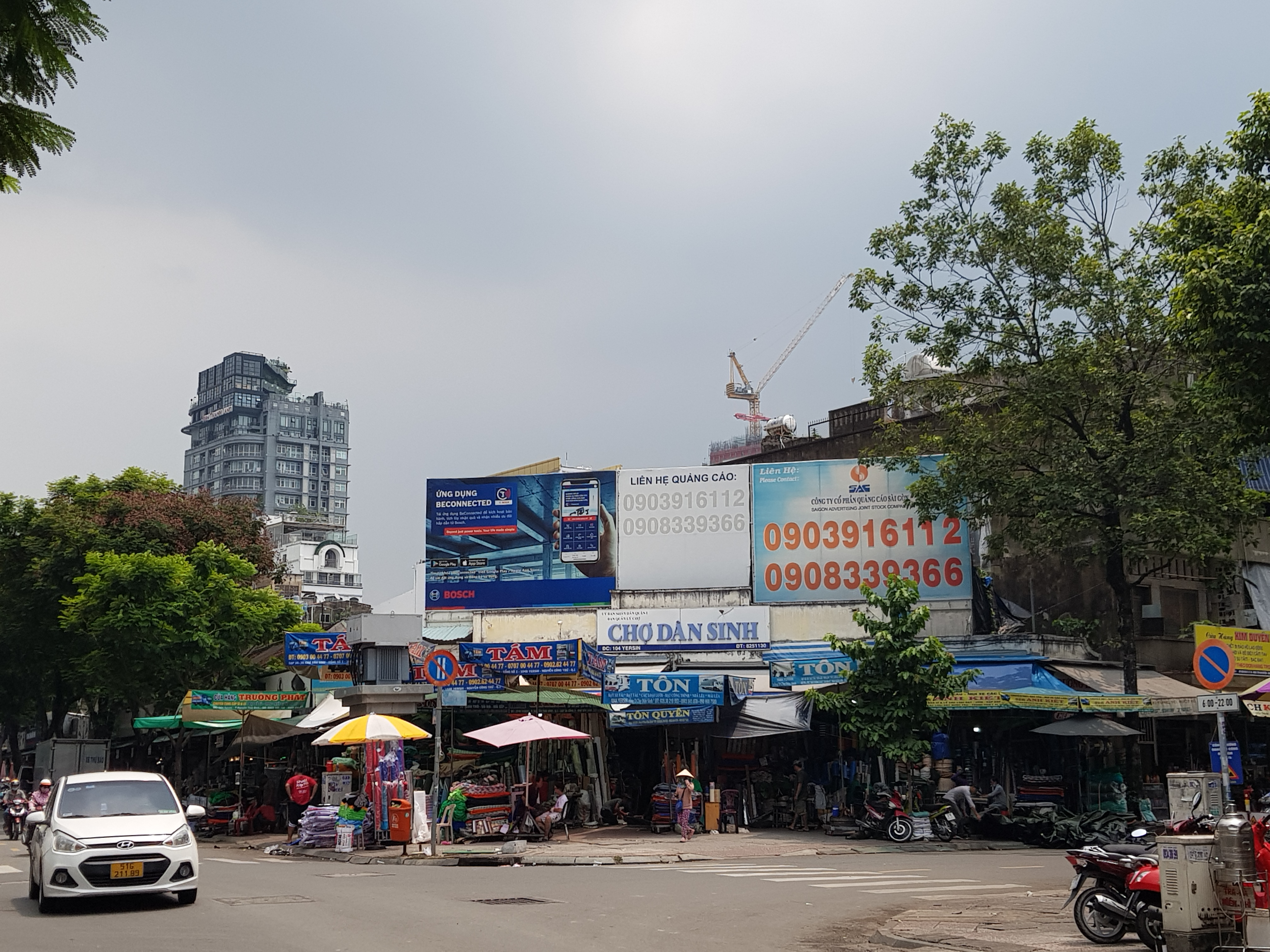
Dân Sinh (or Yersin) Market with Bến Thành Tower on the left

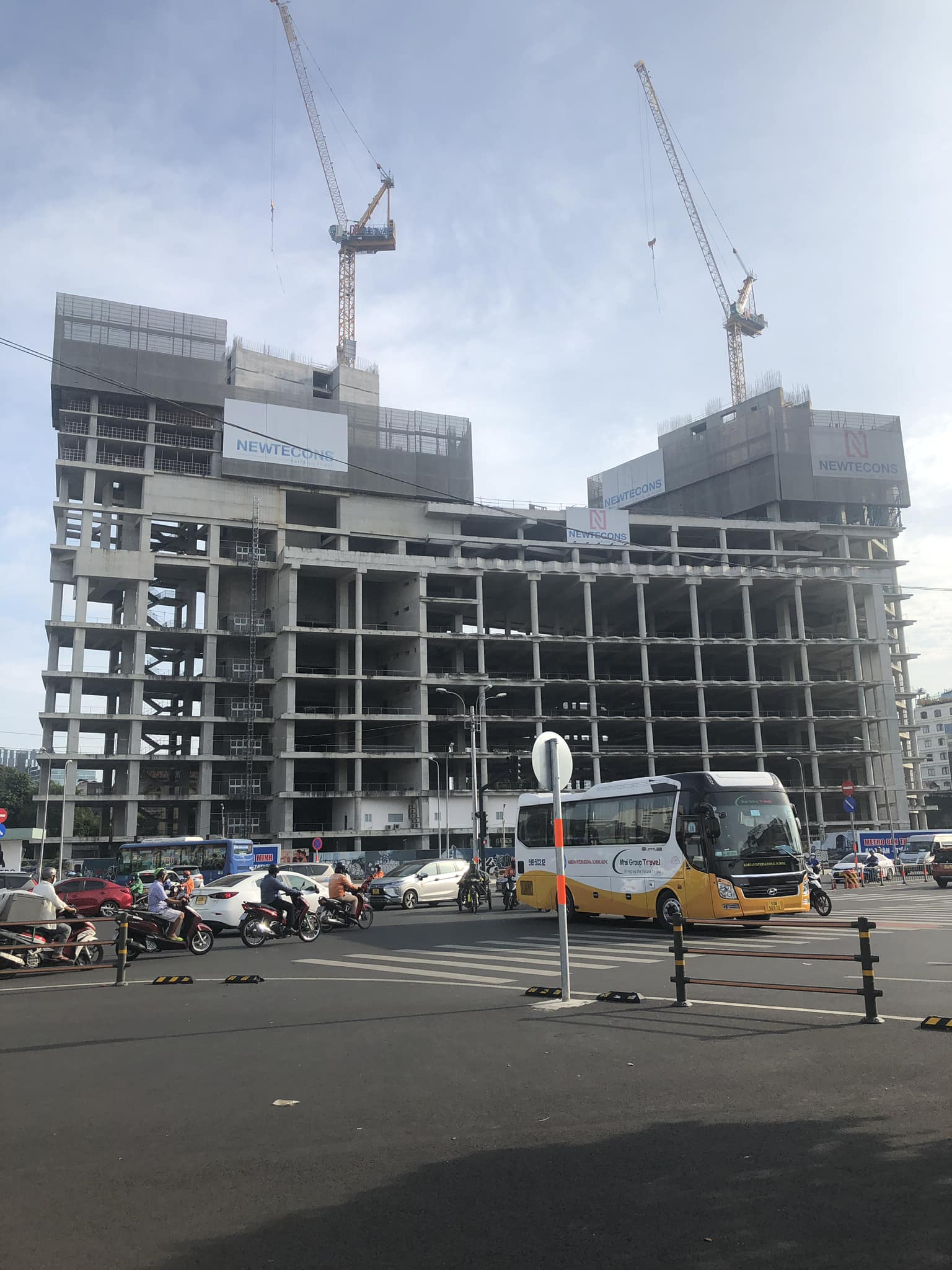
One Central Saigon (under construction)

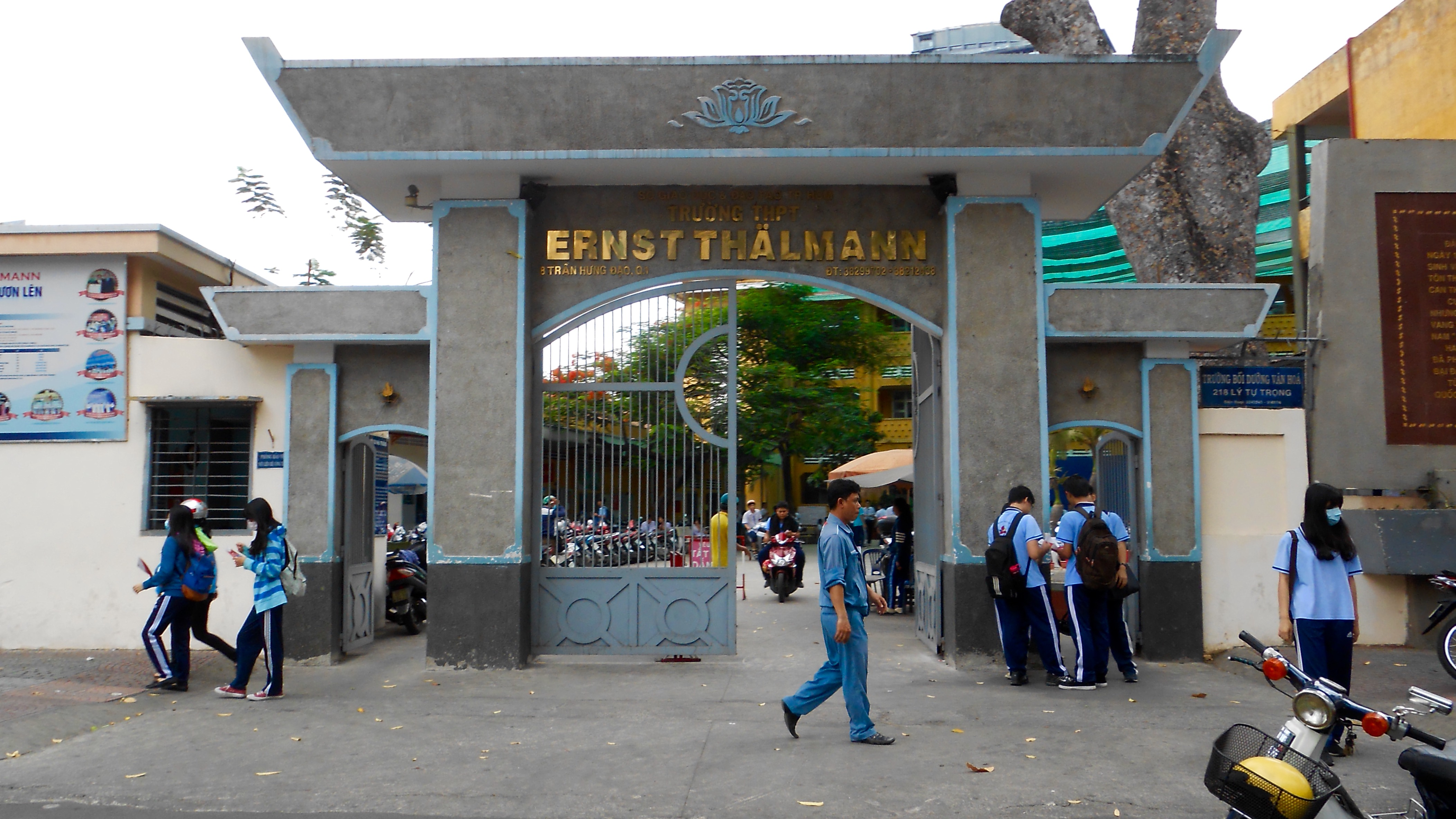
Ernst Thälmann High School

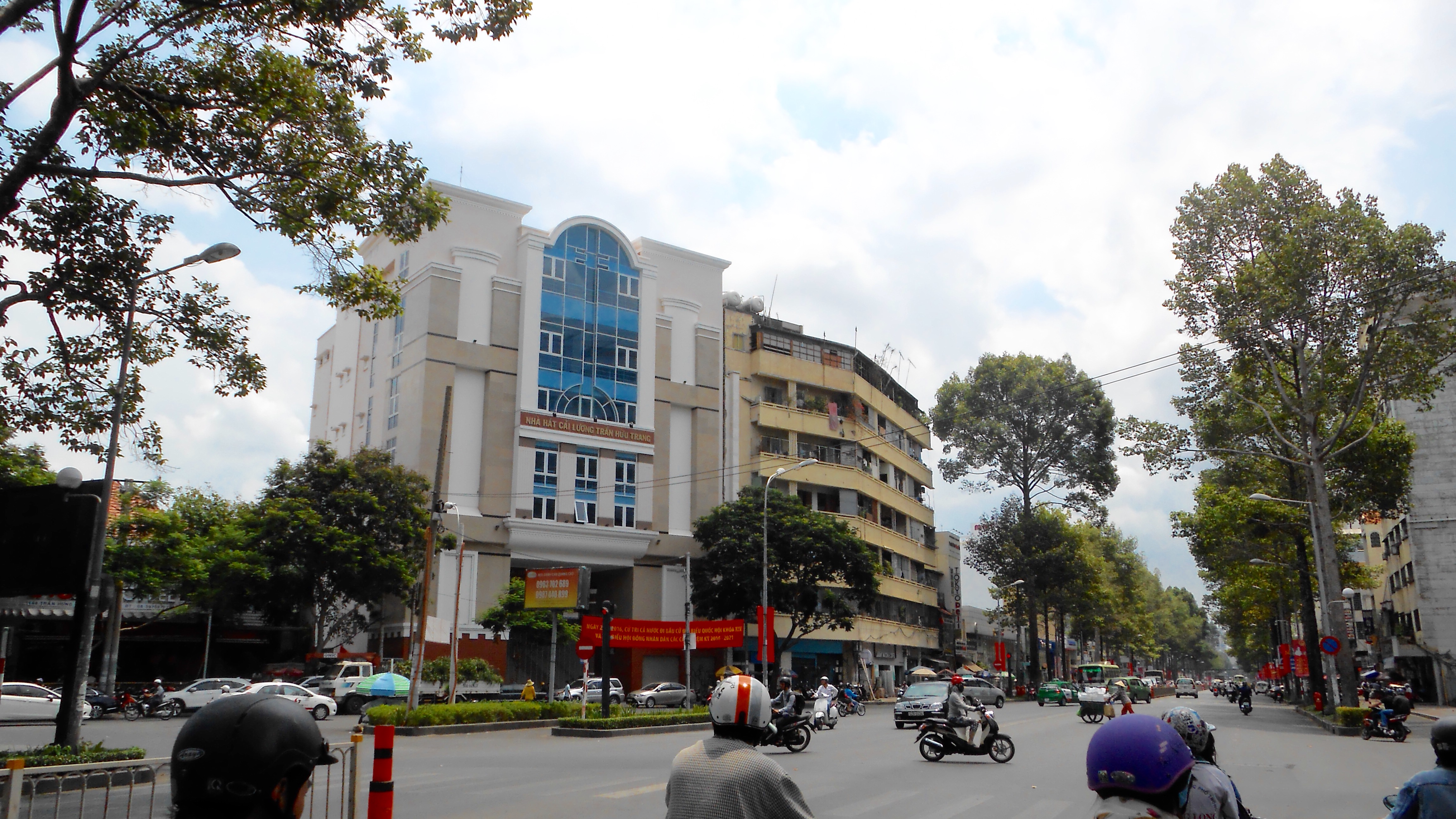
Trần Hữu Trang Cải lương Theatre [vi]

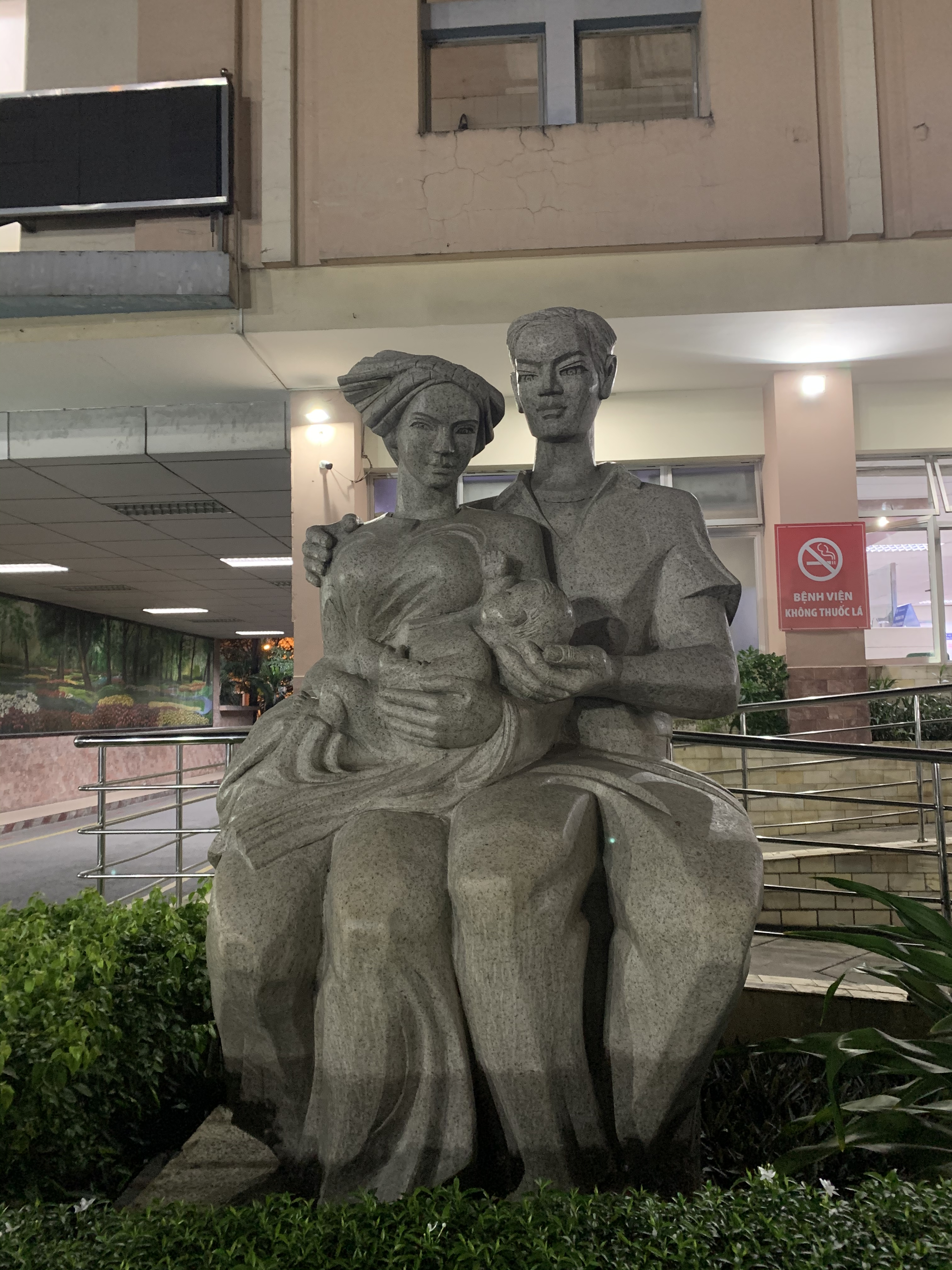
A nuclear family statue inside Từ Dũ Maternity Hospital vi

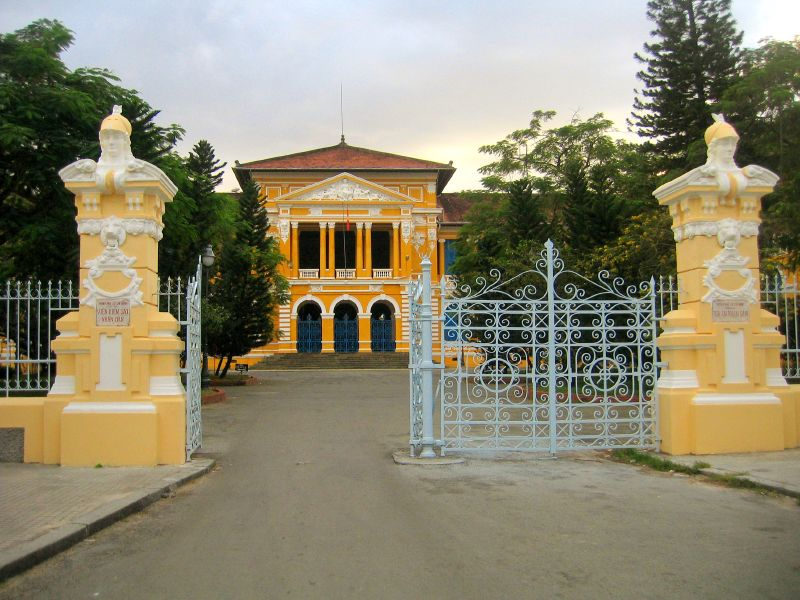
Ho Chi Minh City People's Court Headquarters vi
