= Tien Phong Bank =

Vietnamese bank

- Type: Finance
- Founded: May 5, 2008; 18 years ago in Vietnam
- Founder: Đỗ Minh Phú
- Products: Financial services, banking
- Total assets: 164.593 billion Vietnam dong (30/09/2019)
- Website: tpb.vn

Tien Phong Bank (TPBank) is a bank of Vietnam. Founded on 5 May 2008, TPBank inherits technological expertise and financial strength from its strategic shareholders, including DOJI Gold and Gems Group, FPT Corporation, MobiFone, Vietnam National Reinsurance and SBI Ven Capital Pte. Ltd, Singapore.

== History ==
Tiên Phong Bank was founded on May 5, 2008. In August 2010, the bank increased its charter capital to VND 2,000 billion. In December 2013, TPBank launched its official branding and in December 2014, the bank opened its new headquarters at 57 Lý Thường Kiệt, Hoàn Kiếm, Hanoi. In August 2016, the bank introduced the TPBank World MasterCard credit card and in February 2017, they launched their first automated transaction point system.

In October 2017, TPBank launched the QuickPay QR payment application. In April 2018, TPBank successfully listed 555 million shares on the Ho Chi Minh City Stock Exchange. By March 2019, TPBank's charter capital reached VND 8,566 billion and in December 2020, the bank listed an additional 215,082,516 shares. In December 2021, TPBank's charter capital increased to over VND 15,817 billion. In April 2022, TPBank launched a brand-new digital banking platform for businesses (TPBank Biz).

== See also ==
- List of banks in Vietnam
