= Vietnam International Commercial Joint Stock Bank =

Vietnamese bank

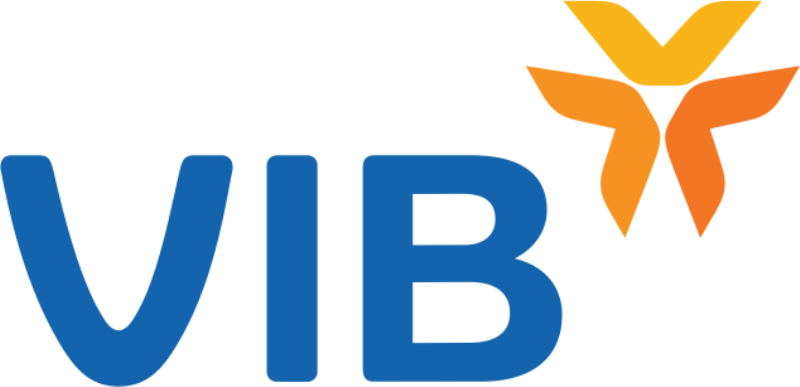

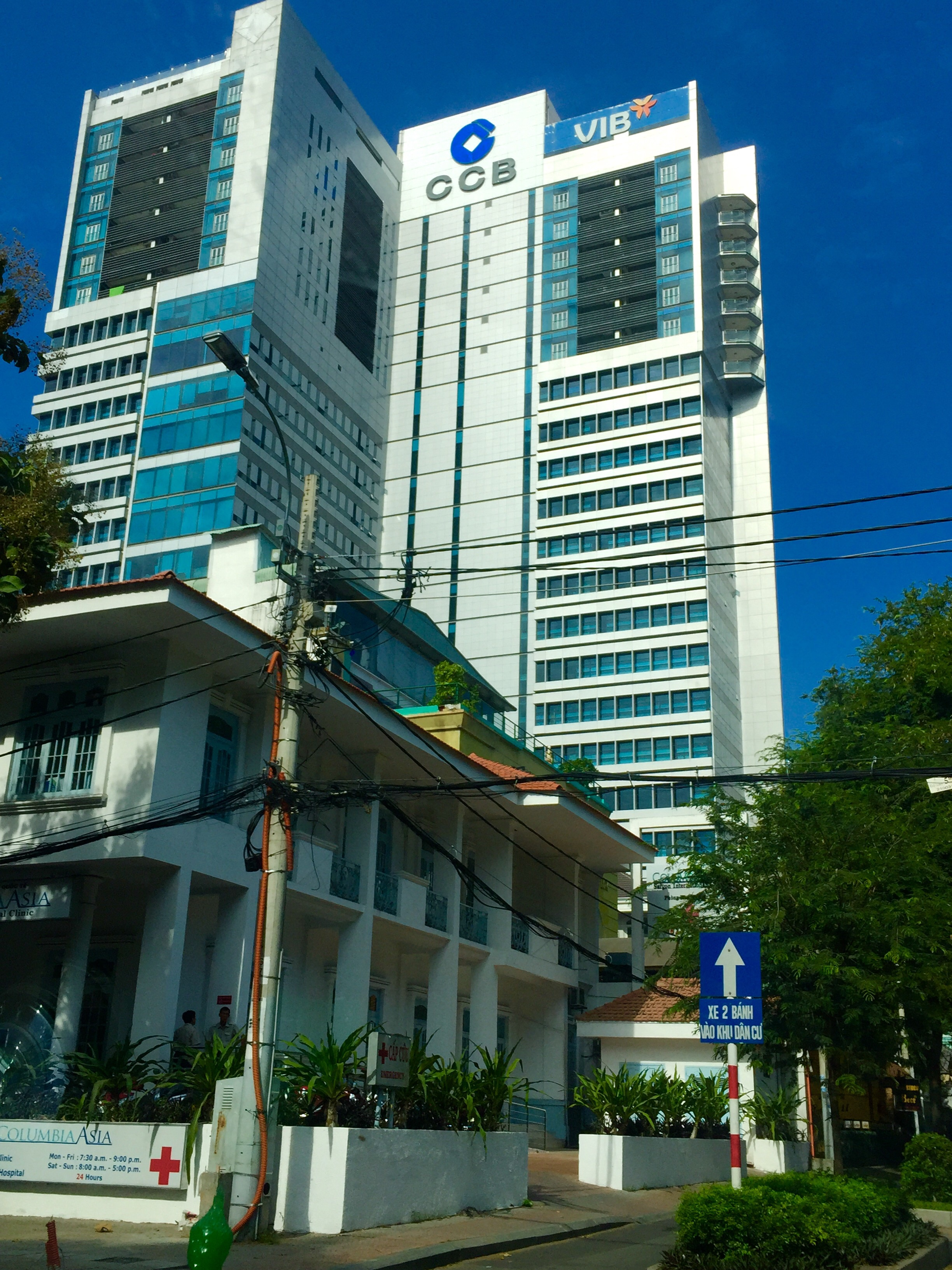
- VIB's headquarters in Ho Chi Minh City
- Traded as: HOSE: VIB
- ISIN: VN000000VIB1
- Industry: Financial services
- Founded: September 18, 1996; 29 years ago
- Headquarters: Sailing Tower, 111A Pasteur Street, Bến Nghé, District 1, Ho Chi Minh City,
- Area served: Vietnam
- Key people: Đặng Khắc Vỹ
- Revenue: ▲18,058 billion VND (2022)
- Operating income: 10,581 billion VND (2022)
- Net income: (2022)
- Total assets: ▲342,799 billion VND (2022)
- Owner: Ministry of Natural Resources and Environment (100%)
- Number of employees: ▲11.000 (2023)
- Website: https://www.vib.com.vn/vn/home

The Vietnam International Commercial Joint Stock Bank (Vietnamese: Ngân hàng TMCP Quốc tế Việt Nam), abbreviated as "VIB", is a commercial bank in Vietnam. It was established in 1996 state-owned (100%) stakeholders by the Ministry of Natural Resources and Environment and is headquartered in Ho Chi Minh City. VIB is one of the largest banks in Vietnam, with a total asset of over VND 383,000 billion (US$16.5 billion) as of December 30, 2023.

== See also ==
- List of banks in Vietnam
