= AgriBank (disambiguation) =

AgriBank is a U.S. Farm Credit Bank that is part of the U.S. Farm Credit System.

AgriBank may also refer to:

- Vietnam Bank for Agriculture and Rural Development a commercial bank in Vietnam also known as Agribank
- AgriBank PLC, a bank in Malta
- Agricultural Development Bank of Zimbabwe (ADBZ), also known as Agribank
- Keshavarzi Bank, an Iranian bank also known as Agribank
