= Ministry of Agriculture and Rural Development (Vietnam) =

Government ministry of Vietnam

Ministry of Agriculture and Rural Development Socialist Republic of Vietnam
- Bộ Nông nghiệp và Phát triển Nông thôn

Ministry overview
- Formed: 14 November 1945
- Preceding Ministry: Ministry of Agriculture (1945–1955) Ministry of Agriculture and Forestry (1955–1960) Ministry of Agriculture (1960–1971), Ministry of Farming (1960–1971) Ministry of Ration and Food (1969–1981) Central Committee of Agriculture (1971–1976) Ministry of Agriculture (1976–1987), Ministry of Sea Fishery (1976–1981), Ministry of Forestry (1976–1995) Ministry of Ration (1981–1987), Ministry of Food Technology (1981–1987), Ministry of Fishery (1981–2007) Ministry of Agriculture and Food Technology (1987–1995) Ministry of Agriculture and Rural Development (1995–present)
- Dissolved: 18 February 2025
- Superseding Ministry: Ministry of Agriculture and Environment
- Type: Government Ministry
- Jurisdiction: Government of Vietnam
- Headquarters: 2 Ngoc Ha Street, Ngoc Ha Ward, Ba Dinh District, Hanoi
- Annual budget: 21.141 billions VND (2018)
- Minister responsible: Lê Minh Hoan
- Deputy Minister responsible: Nguyễn Hoàng Hiệp Nguyễn Quốc Trị Trần Thanh Nam Phùng Đức Tiến Hoàng Trung
- Website: www.mard.gov.vn

The Ministry of Agriculture and Rural Development (MARD, Vietnamese: Bộ Nông nghiệp và Phát triển Nông thôn) was a government ministry responsible for rural development and the governance, promotion and nurturing of agriculture and the agriculture industry, in Vietnam. The purview of the Ministry includes forestry, aquaculture, irrigation and the salt industry; it is also involved in water management and flood control.

The Ministry maintains 63 provincial department offices throughout Vietnam. The Ministry itself is located in Hanoi.

On 18 February 2025, the Ministry merged with the Ministry of Natural Resources and Environment to form the Ministry of Agriculture and Environment.

== History ==
The Ministry of Agriculture and Rural Development has been developed since 1987 by the combination of different government ministries: Ministry of Agriculture, Ministry of Food, combined to the Ministry of Agriculture and Food Industry in 1987; the subsequent addition of the Ministry of Forestry and the Ministry of Irrigation to form today's Ministry; as well as the addition of the Ministry of Fisheries in 2007. The Ministry was officially formed in 1995.

== Organisation ==
The Ministry is organised into many work areas:

=== Organisations in charge of state management ===
- Planning Department
- Finance Department
- Science, Technology and Environment Department
- International Cooperation Department
- Legislation Department
- Personal and Organisation Department
- Ministerial Inspection
- MARD Office
- Department of Cultivation
- Plant Protection Department
- Department of Husbandry
- Veterinary/Animal Health Department
- Agro-forestry Processing and Salt Industry Department
- Forest Protection Department
- Vietnam Department of Forestry (VNFOREST)
- Aqua Exploiting and Protection Department
- Department of Aquaculture
- Water Resource Department
- Dyke Management and Flood Control Department
- Works/Construction Department
- Cooperatives and Rural Development Department
- National Agro-aqua-forestry Quality Assurance Department
- Vietnam Department of Fisheries

=== Other ===
- Digital Transformation and Statistics Centre
- National Agriculture Extension Centre
- Vietnam Agriculture Newspaper
- Agriculture and Rural Development Magazine
- Agricultural Publishing House One Member Company Limited
- Agribank

== See also ==
- Agribusiness
- Agriculture in Vietnam
- Aquaculture and fishery
- Spiny lobster culture in Vietnam
- Vietnam fisheries patrol
- Economy of Vietnam
- Forestry and timberland
- Provinces of Vietnam
- Vietnam Bank for Agriculture and Rural Development
