= SACOMBANK =

Vietnamese banking company

Saigon Treasure Commercial Joint Stock Bank
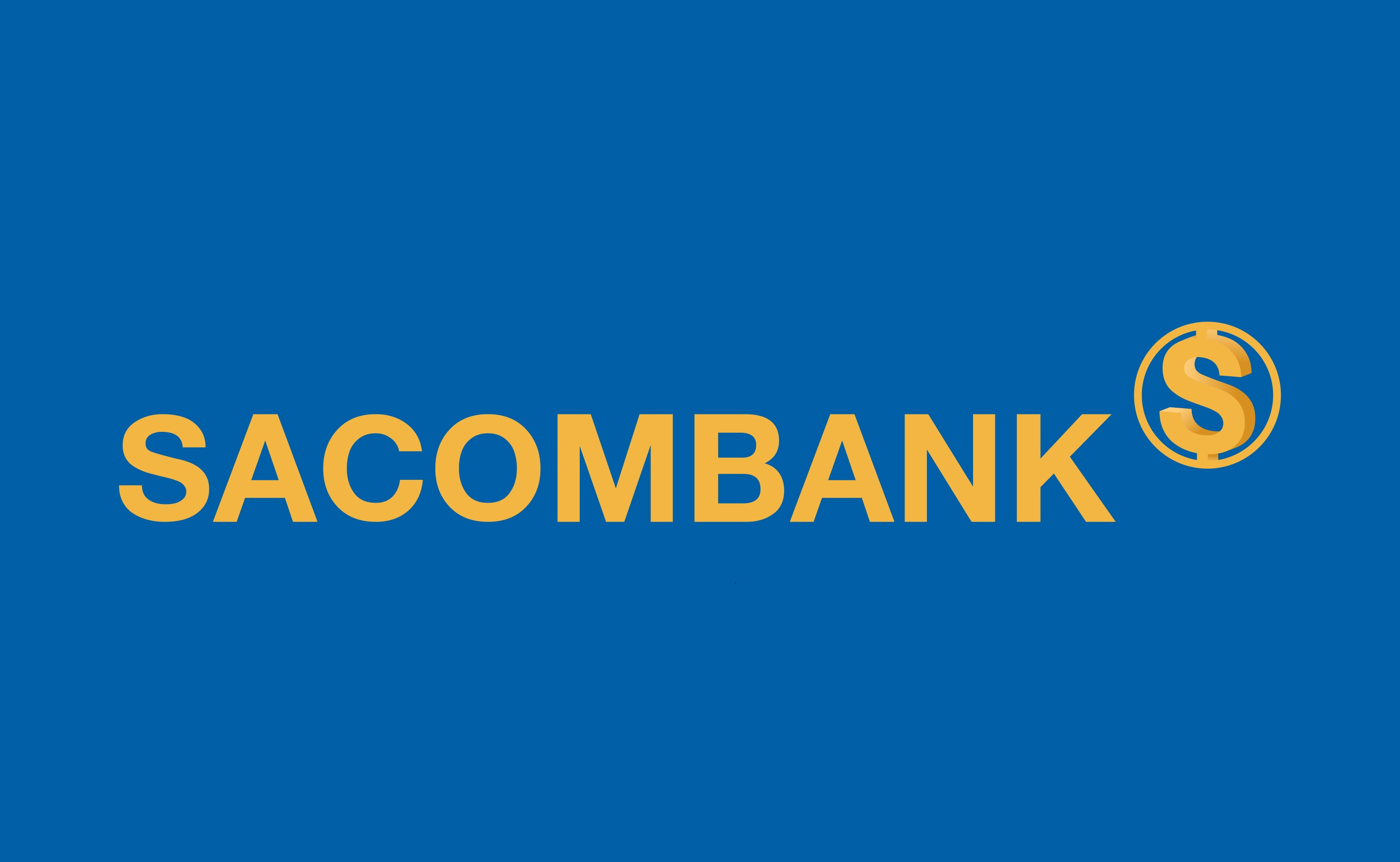
- Logo used from 2025

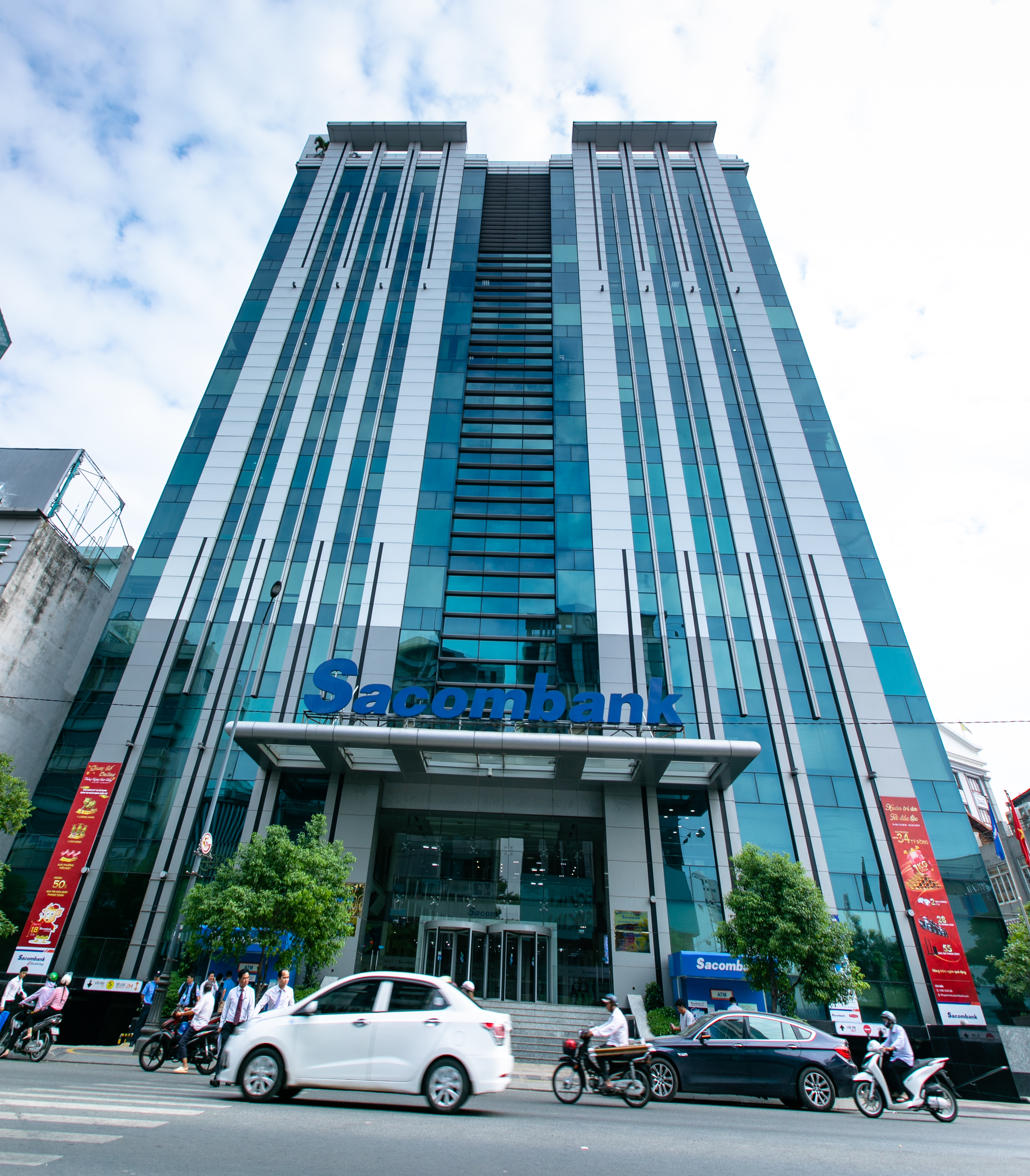
- Sacombank's headquarters in Ho Chi Minh City, Vietnam
- Native name: Ngân hàng Thương mại Cổ phần Sài Gòn Tài Lộc
- Traded as: HOSE: STB
- Industry: Financial services
- Founded: December 5, 1991; 34 years ago
- Headquarters: 266–268 Nam Kỳ Khởi Nghĩa Street, Xuân Hòa, District 3, Ho Chi Minh City
- Area served: Vietnam
- Key people: Dương Công Minh – Chairperson; Nguyễn Đức Thụy – Acting CEO
- Total assets: ▲492.637 billion VND (2022)
- Number of employees: 16.000 (2022)
- Website: www.sacombank.com.vn

Saigon Treasure Commercial Joint Stock Bank (Vietnamese: Ngân hàng Thương mại Cổ phần Sài Gòn Tài Lộc), commonly referred to as Sacombank, is a Vietnamese commercial joint stock bank established in 1991.

== History ==
Sacombank was established on December 21, 1991 in Ho Chi Minh City. In 1996, Sacombank issued its first shares.

In 2002, Sacombank established its first subsidiary Sacombank–SBA Debt Management and Asset Exploitation Company. In December 2007, Sacombank opened a branch in Vientiane, Laos. By June 2009, it had opened a branch in Phnom Penh, Cambodia.

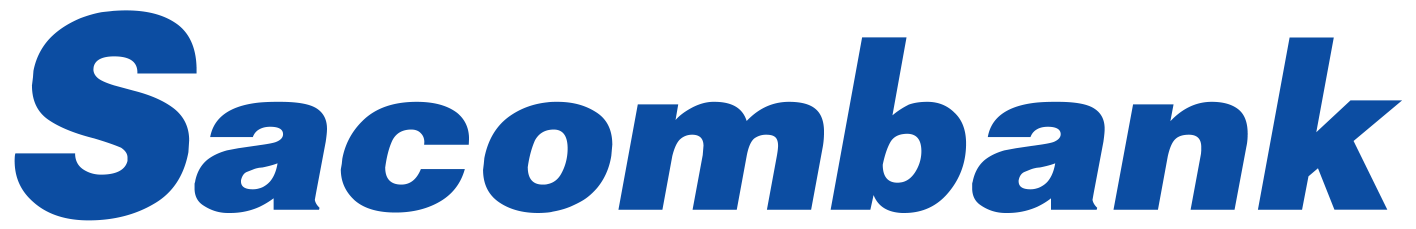
Sacombank logo used from 2018 to 2025

On October 1, 2015, Southern Bank was officially merged into Sacombank by the decision of the State Bank of Vietnam. As a result, Sacombank has acquired and inherited all of Southern Bank's assets and related liabilities since the merger date.

== Scandal ==
On November 23, 2022, the Investigation Police Agency of Khanh Hoa Province Police Department officially prosecuted four individuals who used to work at Sacombank – Cam Ranh City Branch. The four former employees of Sacombank Transaction Office were accused of borrowing money from outside and from customers in their personal capacity. The incident was discovered when customers came to withdraw money at Sacombank Cam Ranh Branch. These customers then filed a complaint with the investigating agency. According to a source, the total amount of money that the four employees of Sacombank Cam Ranh branch borrowed from people was up to more than 100 billion VND.

Sacombank has decided to dismiss these employees and appoint new ones to ensure the stable operation of Cam Ranh Transaction Office. Sacombank also reported the incident to the State Bank of Vietnam, Khánh Hòa Province Branch, and at the same time transferred the case to the competent authority for investigation.

== See also ==
- Banking in Vietnam
- List of banks in Vietnam
- State Bank of Vietnam
