= Vietnam Maritime Commercial Join Stock Bank =

- Traded as: HOSE: MSB
- ISIN: VN000000MSB9
- Industry: Financial services
- Founded: July 12, 1991; 35 years ago
- Headquarters: 54A Nguyen Chi Thanh Street, Lang Thuong Province, Dong Da District, Ha Noi
- Area served: Vietnam
- Key people: Nguyễn Hoàng Linh
- Total assets: ▲267.000 billion VND (2022)
- Owner: Vietnam Maritime Administration under the Ministry of Transport
- Website: msb.com.vn

Vietnam Maritime Commercial Joint Stock Bank (MSB), formerly known as Maritime Bank is the first commercial joint stock bank to be granted a license in Vietnam.

Maritime Bank was established on July 12, 1991, in Haiphong. In 2005, the Bank moved its headquarters to Hanoi. On August 12, 2015, Maritime Bank merged with Mekong Development Joint Stock Bank, with total assets of $5310931278.28 and charter capital of $507345061.14. . On January 14, 2019, Maritime Bank created a new logo and rebranded with the name MSB.

== See also ==
- List of banks in Vietnam
- Visa
