= MB Bank =

Vietnamese bank

Military Commercial Joint Stock Bank
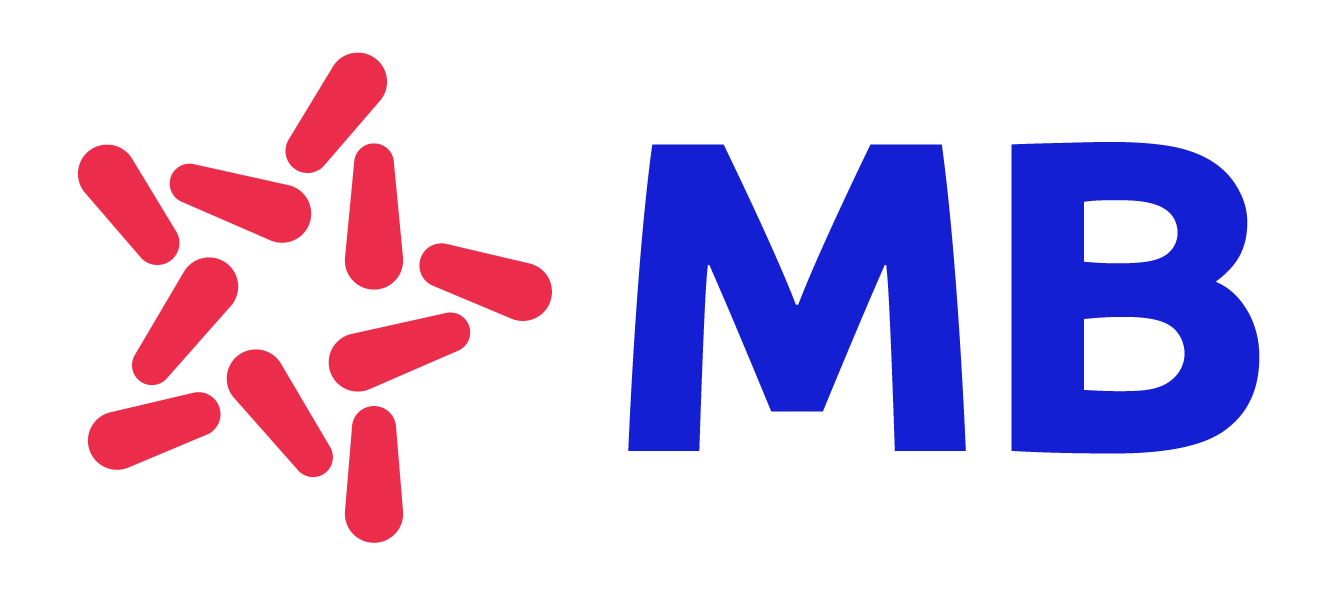

- Trade name: MBBank
- Native name: Ngân hàng thương mại cổ phần Quân đội
- Traded as: HOSE: MBB
- Industry: Financial services
- Founded: November 4, 1994; 32 years ago
- Headquarters: No. 18 Lê Văn Lượng Rd, Trung Hoà Ward, Cầu Giấy District (now Yên Hoà Ward), Hanoi
- Area served: Vietnam
- Key people: Lưu Trung Thái; Phạm Như Ánh
- Total assets: ▲950.000 billion VND (2022)
- Owner: MOD
- Number of employees: 16.136 (2022)
- Website: www.mbbank.com.vn

Military Commercial Joint Stock Bank (Ngân hàng thương mại cổ phần Quân đội), operating as the Military Bank (MB or redundantly MB Bank; Vietnamese: Ngân hàng Quân đội), is a Vietnamese commercial joint stock bank and a subsidiary of Vietnam's Ministry of National Defence.

== History ==
MB was established on November 4th, 1994, with initial charter capital of 500 billion VND. In 2000, MB Bank established Thang Long Securities Company Limited (now Military Commercial Joint Stock Bank Securities Corporation - MBS) and Military Commercial Joint Stock Bank's Debt Management and Asset Exploitation Company (MBAMC).

In 2003, MB implemented a comprehensive restructuring of its systems and human resources, while in 2004, it became the first bank to issue shares through public auction with a total par value of 20 billion VND.

In 2008, MB Bank underwent organizational restructuring and the military telecommunications group Viettel officially became a strategic shareholder. In 2009, MB launched the 247 Customer Service Center and opened its first overseas branch in Laos in 2010.

MB successfully listed its shares on the Ho Chi Minh City Stock Exchange (HSX) from November 1st, 2011 and opened its second overseas branch in Cambodia in the same year.

== Incident ==
On January 8, 2020, some individual customers of MB Bank were able to spend beyond their account balance and card limit. A system error allowed them to make payments and withdrawals even if they did not have enough money in their accounts.

Immediately after detecting the incident, MB blocked the accounts of these customers and requested them to refund the overspent amount. The bank confirmed that the incident did not affect the operations of MB and the assets of other customers. A representative of MB Bank acknowledged the occurrence of an online transaction error exceeding the limit.

== See also ==
- Banking in Vietnam
- List of banks in Vietnam
- State Bank of Vietnam
