= Vietnam Bank for Agriculture and Rural Development =

Commercial bank in Vietnam

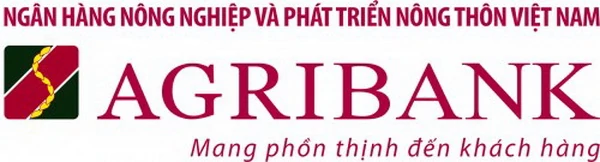
- Trade name: Agribank
- Native name: Ngân hàng Nông nghiệp và Phát triển Nông thôn Việt Nam
- Type: State-owned
- Industry: Banking, Finance, Security
- Founded: 26 March 1988
- Headquarters: No. 2 Lang Ha Street, Ba Đình district, Hanoi, Vietnam
- Key people: Pham Duc An, Chairman Pham Toan Vuong, CEO
- Products: Transaction accounts Insurance stock brokerage Investment bank Asset-based lending Consumer finance Trade; International payments Foreign exchange
- Net income: ▲$154 million USD
- Total assets: $36,34 billion USD
- Owner: Ministry of Agriculture and Rural Development
- Number of employees: 40,000 full time equivalent
- Website: www.agribank.com.vn

Agribank or formally the Vietnam Bank for Agriculture and Rural Development (Vietnamese: Ngân hàng Nông nghiệp và Phát triển Nông thôn Việt Nam) is the largest commercial bank in Vietnam by total under the Ministry of Agriculture and Rural Development. It is a state-owned corporation under a special status. According to a report by the United Nations Development Programme, Agribank is also the largest corporation in Vietnam.

== History ==
Agribank was established on March 26, 1988. It is the first state-owned commercial bank of Vietnam, established with the objective of focusing credit resources to serve the development of agriculture, farmers, and rural areas.

By 2000, Agribank had 2,300 branches and transaction offices nationwide, accounting for 40% of the agricultural credit market share. In 2011, Agribank converted to a one-member limited liability company owned 100% by the State.

In 2018, total assets reached nearly 1.3 trillion VND, mobilized capital reached over 1.2 trillion VND, and total outstanding loans and investments reached over 1.1 trillion VND. By December 31, 2020, total assets reached over 1.57 trillion VND; capital reached over 1.45 trillion VND; and total outstanding loans to the economy reached over 1.21 trillion VND. By December 31, 2021, Agribank's total assets reached 1.68 trillion VND; capital reached over 1.58 trillion VND; and total outstanding loans to the economy reached over 1.31 trillion VND. 63 trillion VND; and total outstanding loans to the economy reached over 1.44 trillion VND.

In 2022: Agribank was awarded the "Excellent Payment Quality" award by JP Morgan Bank, USA.

== See also ==
- List of banks in Vietnam
- AgriBank (disambiguation)
