= VPBank =

Vietnamese commercial bank

Vietnam Prosperity Joint-Stock Commercial Bank
- Trade name: VP Bank
- Type: Joint-stock company
- Traded as: HOSE: VPB
- Industry: Financial services
- Founded: 1993
- Headquarters: Hanoi
- Area served: Vietnam
- Key people: Ngo Chi Dzung (chairman); Duc-Vinh Nguyen (CEO)
- Revenue: US$4,050 million (2023)
- Net income: US$419 million (2023)
- Owner: Sumitomo Mitsui Financial Group (15%)
- Number of employees: 24,973 (2023)
- Website: www.vpbank.com.vn/en/ca-nhan

Vietnam Prosperity Joint Stock Commercial Bank (VPBank for short) is a Vietnamese commercial bank based in Hanoi. It was founded in 1993 and is one of the first privately owned banks in the country. With around 250 branches nationwide, VPBank is now one of the most important banks in Vietnam. In the first half of 2025, the bank's total assets exceeded 1.1 quadrillion VND (over US$40 billion), making VPBank the largest private commercial bank in Vietnam in terms of total assets. The bank serves 28 million customers in Vietnam (2023).

== History ==
The bank was founded on August 12, 1993, under its original name, Vietnam Joint Stock Commercial Bank for Private Enterprises. In July 2010, it changed its name to Vietnam Prosperity Joint Stock Commercial Bank (VPBank) as part of a strategic realignment. This rebranding marked the start of a comprehensive modernization and focus on retail banking.

In the 2000s, the bank brought in its first foreign strategic partner: in 2006, Singapore's OCBC Bank acquired an initial 10% stake in VPBank, which it later increased to around 15%. In 2013, however, OCBC withdrew and sold its entire stake to local investors. At that time, VPBank was not yet listed on the stock exchange and ranked 10th among private credit institutions in Vietnam in terms of assets.

In 2017, VPBank went public: its shares (ticker symbol: VPB) were listed on the Ho Chi Minh City Stock Exchange (HoSE). This made VPBank the tenth bank in the country to be listed on the stock exchange and the privately managed bank with the highest market capitalization in Vietnam at the time.

In October 2021, VPBank sold 49% of the shares in its consumer credit subsidiary FE Credit to Sumitomo Mitsui Financial Group (SMFG) for around USD 1.4 billion. Shortly thereafter, SMFG entered into a strategic partnership with VPBank through its banking subsidiary SMBC. This culminated in a capital investment in March 2023, with SMBC acquiring 15% of VPBank shares for USD 1.5 billion. According to Bloomberg, this was one of the largest foreign investments in a Vietnamese company. The capital injection made VPBank the second-largest private bank in Vietnam.

In the course of industry-wide consolidation, VPBank took over the insolvent GPBank in its entirety at the beginning of 2025 on the instructions of the Vietnamese central bank in order to save it.

== Operations ==
VPBank covers a wide range of banking services. Its core business includes private banking, financing for small and medium-sized enterprises (SMEs and corporate banking), consumer loans, and asset management. Through its subsidiaries, the bank also offers specialized financial services. It operates FE Credit, one of Vietnam's largest consumer credit providers, and VPBank Securities, its own securities company. The bank is known for its consistent focus on retail and SME customers and is considered a digital pioneer in the Vietnamese banking sector.
