= Techcombank =

Vietnamese bank

Vietnam Technological and Commercial Joint Stock Bank
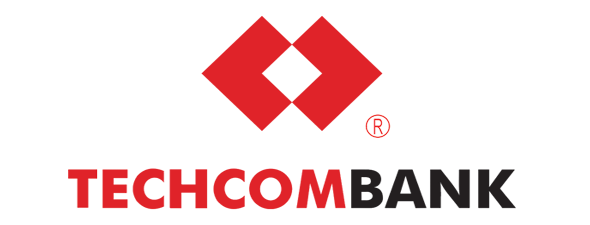
- Native name: Ngân hàng Thương mại cổ phần Kỹ Thương Việt Nam
- Type: Joint stock bank
- Traded as: HOSE: TCB
- Industry: Banking and finance
- Headquarters: Hanoi, Vietnam
- Key people: Ho Hung Anh (chairman); Jens Lottner (CEO)

Vietnam Technological and Commercial Joint Stock Bank, also referred to as Techcombank, is a publicly listed Vietnamese bank. Its shares are traded on the Ho Chi Minh City Stock Exchange under ticker TCB.

== History and ownership ==
Techcombank (TCB) was founded in 1993 by Vietnamese businessmen who returned from Russia. Its domestic investors include Vietnam Airlines and under the Ministry of Science and Technology. In 2005, global bank HSBC acquired a 10% stake in Techcombank. In 2008, HSBC increased its stake in the bank to 20% by making a follow-on investment of $77.1 million. In 2017, HSBC divested its strategic investment in Techcombank by selling its 172 million share stake. In 2018, US private equity firm Warburg Pincus invested $370 million.

In 2018, the company listed its shares on the Ho Chi Minh City Stock Exchange. The company raised more than $900 million through the IPO, making it Vietnam’s largest IPO to date. The majority of the IPO shares was reserved for so-called cornerstone investors, i.e. institutional investors which included GIC, Fidelity and Dragon Capital.

Today, Techcombank is one of the largest joint stock banks in Vietnam. As of 2019, it has more than 300 branches and serves more than 5 million customers. As of 2021, the bank's total assets and net income were VND 568,811bn ($24.89bn) and 18,038bn ($789 million) respectively. In 2024, Techcombank won four prestigious awards from the Asian Banker for excellence in transaction banking, for its use of cloud-based technology, data and AI, for its use of cloud-based technology and growth strategy in retail banking. It was also named as the Best Transaction Bank in Vietnam and top prize for Best Transaction Bank in Vietnam for consecutive two years.

== Debt Collection by Organized Crime ==
On April 17, 2015, several people claiming to be Techcombank employees from the Son Tay branch broke into the warehouse of the Phan Dang Anh family, who live in Xuan Phu commune, Phu Tho district, Hanoi, with the intention of collecting debt and sealing property.

On April 6, 2016, a "special debt collection team" wearing uniforms and carrying batons, shields, and crowbars broke down the door of the house at 756 Quang Trung Street, Ha Dong, belonging to the Doan The Minh family, in order to pressure them to pay their debt.

== Awards ==
- In 2023, Techcombank, a joint stock commercial bank in Vietnam, was awarded the "Best Financial Institution for Syndicated Loan in Vietnam" at The Asset Triple A Country Awards.
- The Asian Banker has recognized Techcombank as the "Best Retail Bank" in Vietnam.
- Best Customer Engagement Bank in Asia awarded by IDC.
- Best Cloud-Based Digital Transformation Bank in Asia-Pacific awarded by The Asian Banker.
