= Diên Hồng =

Diên Hồng originates from the name of a palace in the former Thăng Long Citadel (modern-day Hanoi), where the Diên Hồng Conference was held. The name Diên Hồng may also refer to:

- The Diên Hồng Hall, the central meeting room of the National Assembly Building of Vietnam
- Diên Hồng, a ward in Ho Chi Minh City
- Diên Hồng, a ward in Gia Lai province
