= Bàn Cờ =

Bàn Cờ Phường Bàn Cờ Phú Thạnh, Vườn Chuối, Cư xá Đô Thành
- Ward
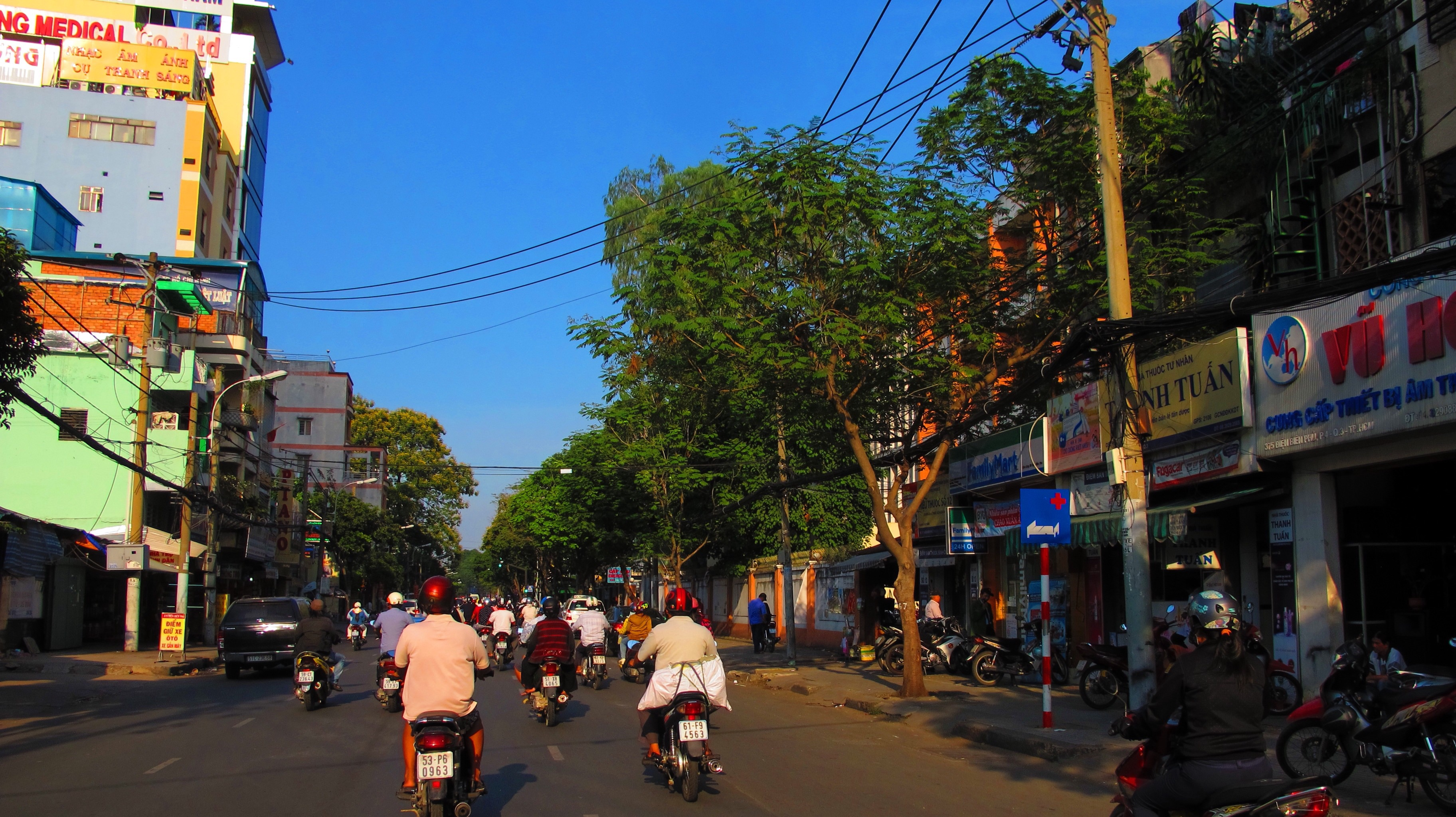
- Điện Biên Phủ Road in Bàn Cờ
- Interactive map of Bàn Cờ
- Coordinates: 10°46′15″N 106°40′55″E
- Country: Vietnam
- Municipality: Ho Chi Minh City
- Established: June 16, 2025

Government
  - Type: Ward-level authority

Area
  - Total: 0.38 sq mi (0.99 km^{2})

Population (2024)
  - Total: 67,616
  - Density: 180,000/sq mi (68,000/km^{2})
- Time zone: UTC+07:00 (Indochina Time)
- Administrative code: 27154

Bàn Cờ (Vietnamese: Phường Bàn Cờ) is a ward of Ho Chi Minh City, Vietnam. It is one of the 168 new wards, communes and special zones of the city following the reorganization in 2025.

== Geography ==
The ward is located in the city center, it is bordered by:

- Bến Thành to the east, with Nguyễn Thị Minh Khai Street as the boundary
- Vườn Lài to the west, with Điện Biên Phủ Street as the boundary
- Vườn Lài, Chợ Quán and Cầu Ông Lãnh to the south
- Xuân Hòa to the north, with Cách Mạng Tháng Tám Street as the boundary.

According to Official Dispatch No. 2896/BNV-CQĐP dated May 27, 2025 of the Ministry of Home Affairs, following the merger, Bàn Cờ has a land area of 0.99 km², the population as of December 31, 2024 is 67,616 people, the population density is 68,298 people/km².

== History ==
On June 16, 2025, the National Assembly Standing Committee issued Resolution No. 1685/NQ-UBTVQH15 on the arrangement of commune-level administrative units of Ho Chi Minh City in 2025 (effective from June 16, 2025). Accordingly, the entire land area and population of Ward 1, Ward 2, Ward 3, Ward 5 and most of Ward 4 (except the triangular block formed by streets of Điện Biên Phủ, Nguyễn Thượng Hiền and Cách Mạng Tháng Tám Street) of the former District 3 will be integrated into a new ward named Bàn Cờ (Clause 5, Article 1).

== Economy ==
Nam Á Bank Building

Bàn Cờ serves as the base for a number of businesses such as Amway, Asia Commercial Bank, BVBank, Saigon Jewelry Company (SJC), Nam Á Bank, Thorakao Cosmetics; and media organizations like Sài Gòn Giải Phóng, Thiếu niên Tiền phong và Nhi đồng*, Pháp Luật Việt Nam* and the former Women Newspaper (Báo Phụ Nữ; merged into Tuổi Trẻ in 2026). Several prominent office buildings are located along the major thoroughfares surrounding the ward, such as Điện Biên Phủ, Nguyễn Thị Minh Khai, Nguyễn Đình Chiểu, August Revolution, Võ Văn Tần and Cao Thắng streets. The Ministry of Justice – Southern Representative Office is also located in the ward.

Note: "*" is for representative office in Ho Chi Minh City

== Notable places ==
Some notable places in the ward, including:

- Bàn Cờ Market
- Vườn Chuối Market
- Nguyen Thien Thuat apartment buildings
- Đô Thành residential area (Cư xá Đô Thành)
- Southern Regional Party Committee's Propaganda Department (Ban Tuyên huấn Xứ ủy Nam Bộ)
- Thorakao Building
- Nguyễn Thượng Hiền Street Food
