= Asia Commercial Bank =

Largest private bank in Vietnam by assets

- Logo used from 2015
- Native name: Ngân hàng Thương mại Cổ phần Á Châu
- Type: State-owned
- Traded as: HOSE: ACB
- Industry: Financial services
- Founded: 19 May 1993
- Headquarters: Ho Chi Minh City, Vietnam
- Number of locations: 346 branches
- Area served: 47 provinces and cities
- Key people: Trần Hùng Huy
- Services: Banking
- Owner: Ministry of Health (100%) stakeholders
- Number of employees: 10,000
- Subsidiaries: ACB Securities, ACB Leasing, ACB Real Estate
- Website: https://www.acb.com.vn/

Asia Commercial Bank (Vietnamese: Ngân hàng Thương mại Cổ phần Á Châu), often abbreviated to ACB, is one of the largest private banks in Vietnam by assets, headquartered at 442 Nguyễn Thị Minh Khai, Bàn Cờ (Ward 5, District 3 formerly), Ho Chi Minh City, Vietnam. It was registered on 19 May 1993 owned by (100%) stake enterprised by the Ministry of Health and began operations in June 1993. The bank trades at the Ho Chi Minh Stock Exchange under the symbol ACB, where it listed on December 9, 2020 after previously trading at the Hanoi Stock Exchange.

== Main services ==
- Raising capital (receiving deposits from customers) in VND, foreign currencies and gold.
- Using capital (providing credit, investment, joint venture capital) in VND, foreign currency and gold.
- Intermediary services (local/international public and quick money transfers, life insurance).
- Trading foreign currency and gold.
- Issuance and payment of credit and debit cards.

== Controversies ==
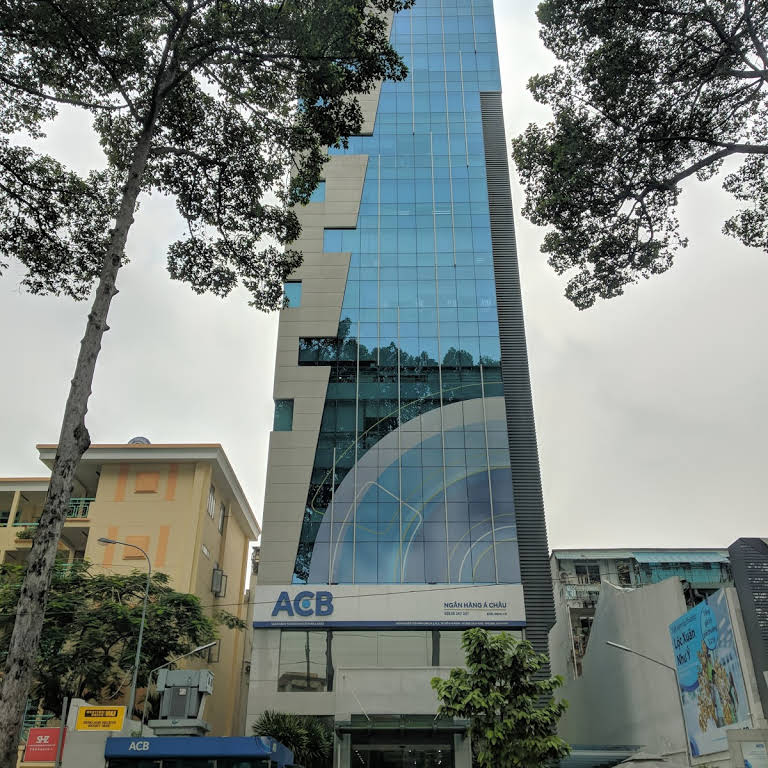
ACB Ho Chi Minh City Branch on the same Nguyễn Thị Minh Khai Street nearby the headquarters

According to PetroTimes, on August 22, 2012, Lý Xuân Hải - General Director of ACB - was ordered to be detained for 4 months by the Supreme People's Procuracy. Hải was prosecuted and taken into custody to investigate acts of intentionally violating State regulations on economic management. Tuổi Trẻ Online confirmed this the next day. On the same day, it was reported by VnExpress that ACB's Board of Directors had approved Hải's resignation letter for personal reasons, and appointed Đỗ Minh Toàn as General Director since August 23. As revealed by Toàn, customers withdrew 5 billion VND (240 million USD) from the bank on Wednesday, August 22.

On September 19, 2012, ACB announced their approval of resignation by Chairman Trần Xuân Giá and two Vice Chairmen, Lê Vũ Kỳ and Trịnh Kim Quang, due to their involvement in Hải's case. On the same day, Eximbank's management approved Phạm Trung Cang's resignation from the position of Vice Chairman. Trương Văn Phước - Eximbank's General Director - said that Cang resigned because he needed time to explain his responsibilities during his previous working time at ACB.

On September 27, the Ministry of Public Security informed that the four defendants - Trần Xuân Giá, Lê Vũ Kỳ, Trịnh Kim Quang, and Phạm Trung Cang - had been prosecuted, and were currently forbidden to leave their residence. Those previous managers of ACB were accused of having issued a policy of entrusting employees to use ACB's capital in contravention of regulations, causing serious consequences. They were accomplices with the two people arrested earlier, former general director Lý Xuân Hải and former vice chairman Nguyễn Đức Kiên. The investigating agency assessed that their actions were contrary to the provisions of Article 106 of the Law on Credit Institutions and the guiding circular of the State Bank - and has caused loss of hundreds of billions of VND.

== Awards ==
- Vietnam's Top 10 Best Commercial Banks.
- The 10 Most Trusted and Effective Commercial Banks in Vietnam.
- Top 50 listed companies in Vietnam.
- Best companies to work for in Asia 2021.
- Inspirational Brand Award
- Best Domestic Bank 2017
- Best Bank for Corporate Social Responsibility.
- The Top 10 Most Trusted Vietnamese Commercial Banks.

== See also ==
- List of banks in Vietnam
