= No. 1 Lý Thái Tổ Park =

Public park in Ho Chi Minh City, Vietnam

- Công viên số 1 Lý Thái Tổ
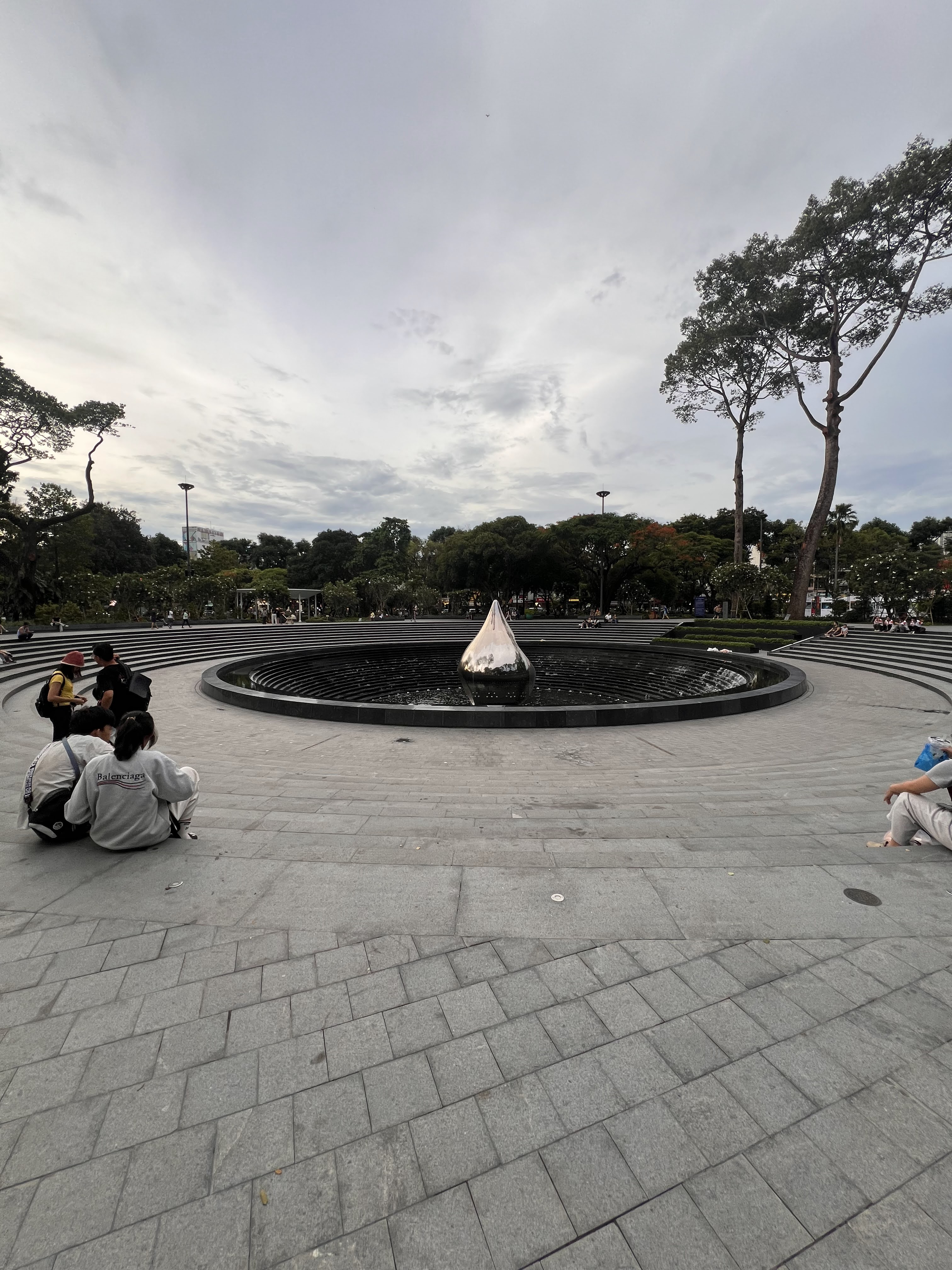
- Water Drop Monument and the central plaza.
- Interactive map of No. 1 Lý Thái Tổ Park
- Type: public park, commemorative space
- Location: No. 1 Lý Thái Tổ Street, Vườn Lài, Ho Chi Minh City, Vietnam
- Coordinates: 10.7651652°N 106.6798331°E
- Area: 4.3 ha (11 acres)
- Opened: 12 February 2026

No. 1 Lý Thái Tổ Park (Vietnamese: Công viên số 1 Lý Thái Tổ) is a public park and memorial space in Vườn Lài ward, Ho Chi Minh City, Vietnam. The park occupies a 4.3 ha (11 acres) triangular site bounded by Lý Thái Tổ Street, Hùng Vương Street and Trần Bình Trọng Street, facing the Cong Hoa six-way intersection.

The park opened on the evening of 12 February 2026. Its central feature is the Water Drop Monument, a memorial to people who died during the COVID-19 pandemic in Ho Chi Minh City.

== Location ==
The park is located at No. 1 Lý Thái Tổ Street. The site is bounded by Lý Thái Tổ, Hùng Vương and Trần Bình Trọng streets, and faces the Cong Hoa six-way intersection. The park main entrance is at the corner of Lý Thái Tổ and Hùng Vương, near the roundabout. After opening, the park is being used as a green space and for community activities.

== History ==
=== Former Villas and Government Guest Houses ===
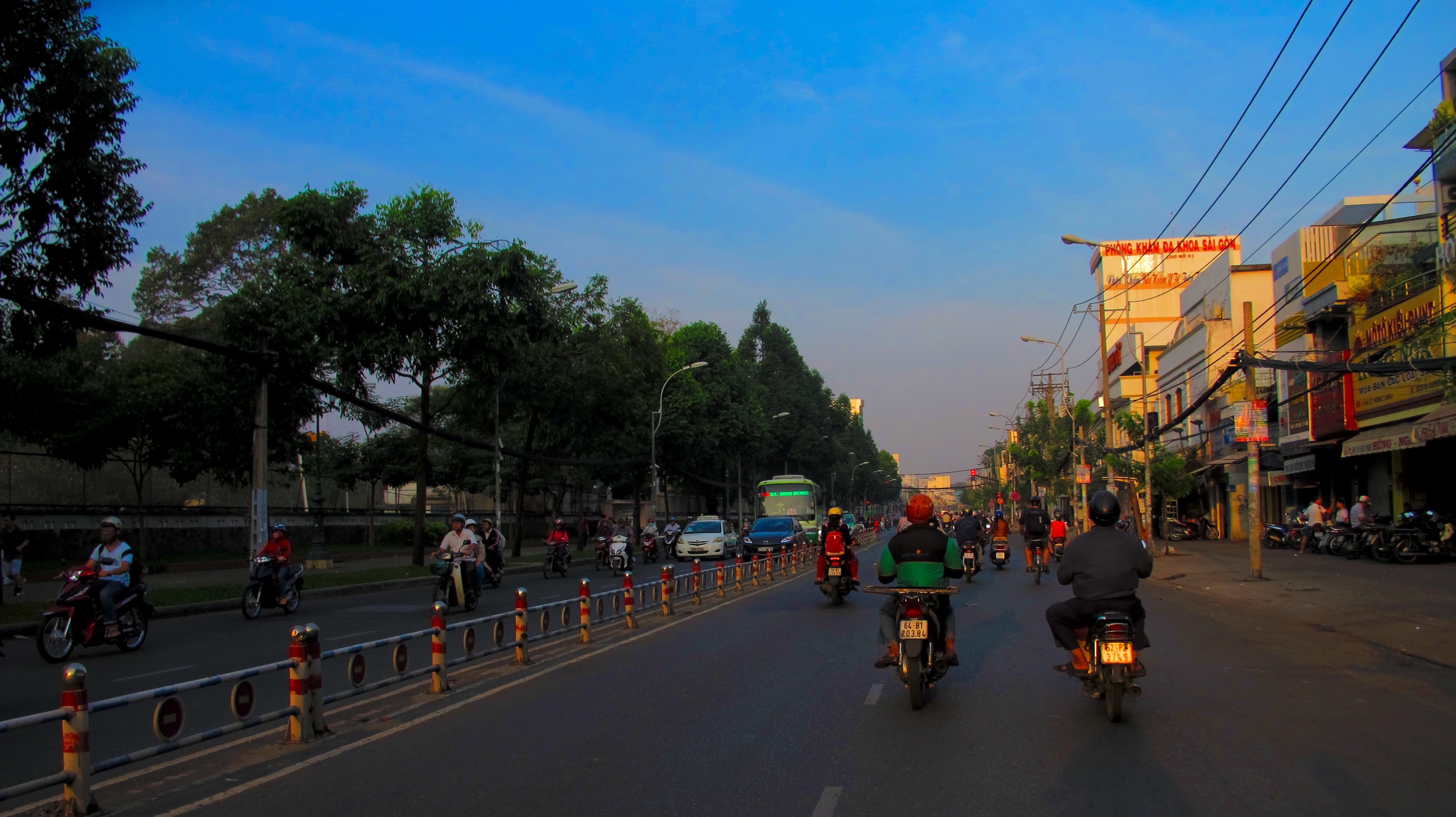
Site of modern-day No. 1 Lý Thái Tổ Park (walled on the left side of this photo) prior to becoming a public park.

The site of No. 1 Lý Thái Tổ used to belong to Hứa Bổn Hòa, a wealthy Chinese-Vietnamese businessman in Saigon. Built in the 1930s to a design by French architect Paul Veysseyre, the main villas' compound covered about 3.7 ha (9.1 acres) and fronted Lý Thái Tổ, Hùng Vương and Trần Bình Trọng streets. Formerly, the site had eight separate villas and was used as a private retreat by Hua Bon Hoa's family. In 2025, the villa compound had seven villas with a total area of about 7,000 m^{2} (75,000 sq ft), and the rest consisted mainly of orchards, flower gardens and old trees. The remaining villas on the campus are painted creamy yellow and with Art Deco design in appearance, with little icon or figurine decoration on the outside.

In 1955, the Hua Bon Hoa family donated the villa compound to the International Committee for Armistice Control under the Geneva Agreement for hospitality and work purposes. After the 19773 Paris Agreement, the compound continued to be used as a hospitality site for international delegations.

From 1975, the villas were used as Vietnamese Government Guest House, under the management of Ministry of Foreign Affairs, for hosting high-level working delegations in Ho Chi Minh City. In 2011, the Ministry of Finance agreed to put this property up for auction but this auction was never carried out, then the site was neglected for many years after. Then, for a short period, one villa facing Lý Thái Tổ street and a part of the land was leased for restaurant business and as a sports field. In 2017, the land again got neglected and many infrastructure were seriously degraded.

=== Conversion to public park ===
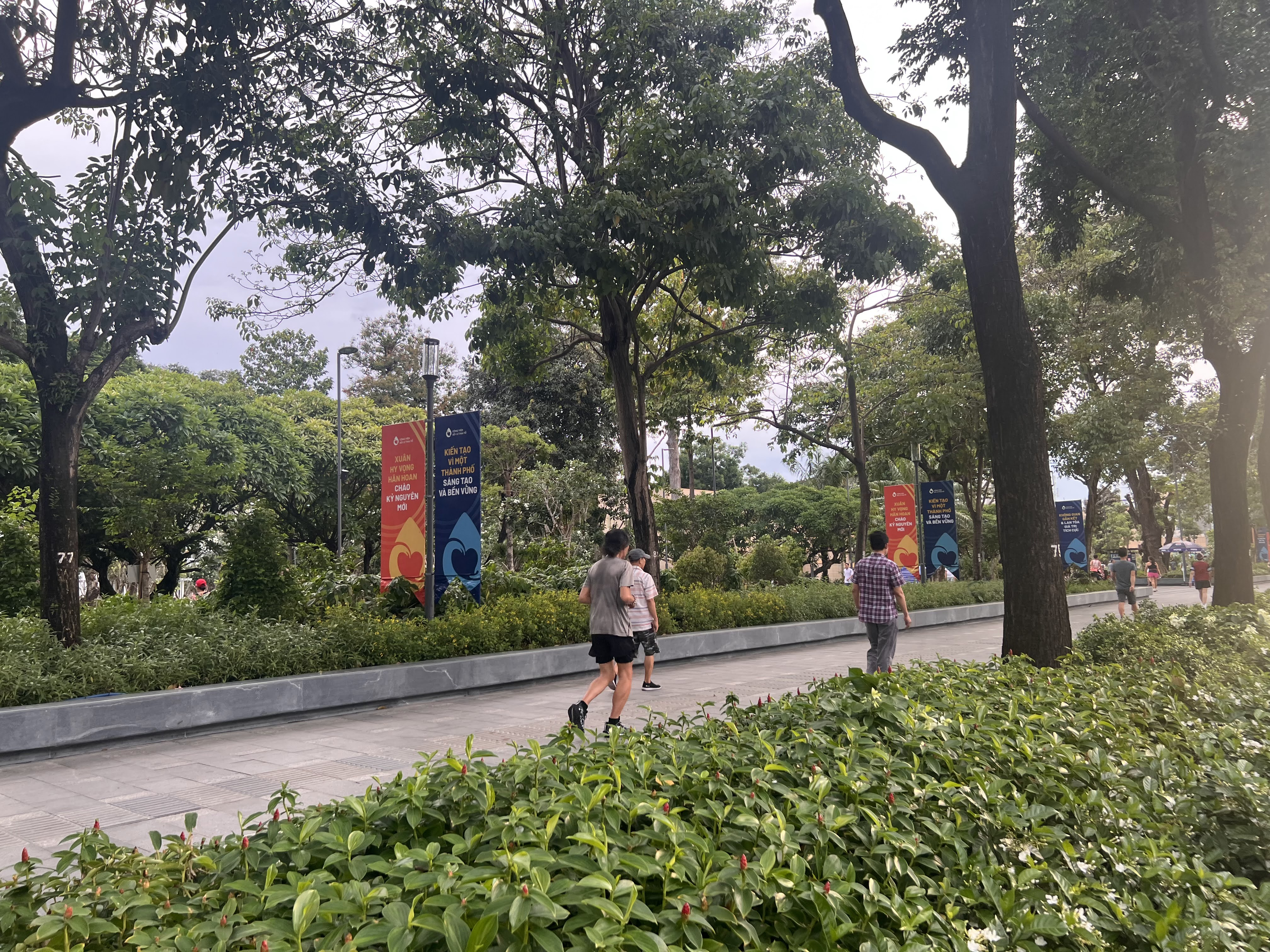
Tree-lined walkway and landscaping at No. 1 Lý Thái Tổ Park.

The idea of converting the land into a public park was publicly stated in 2025. At the conference for summarizing 50 years of literature and art in Ho Chi Minh City on 18 October 2025, Secretary of the Ho Chi Minh City Communist Party Committee Trần Lưu Quang said the triangular site of No. 1 Lý Thái Tổ street would be converted into a public park and the city has the idea of constructing a memorial monument to the victims of the COVID-19 pandemic on that site.

After that, city authorities inventoried and classified the site's villas, collected opinions on design plan and refined the zoning plan of the site at the scale of 1/2000. Later, the HCMC Construction Department submitted proposal No. 13379 on the planned construction of a memorial to the COVID-19 in the site; the report is associated with the research and local adjustment in the plan to form a public park, green space, playground and exploiting the underground space of the site. The Construction Department also proposed to construct a public park, a monument to the COVID-19 pandemic's victims and exploiting the underground of the land and connected sites. The proposal to the park conversion and building the memorial called for public investment or through private funding in the form of build-transfer model without public rebursement.

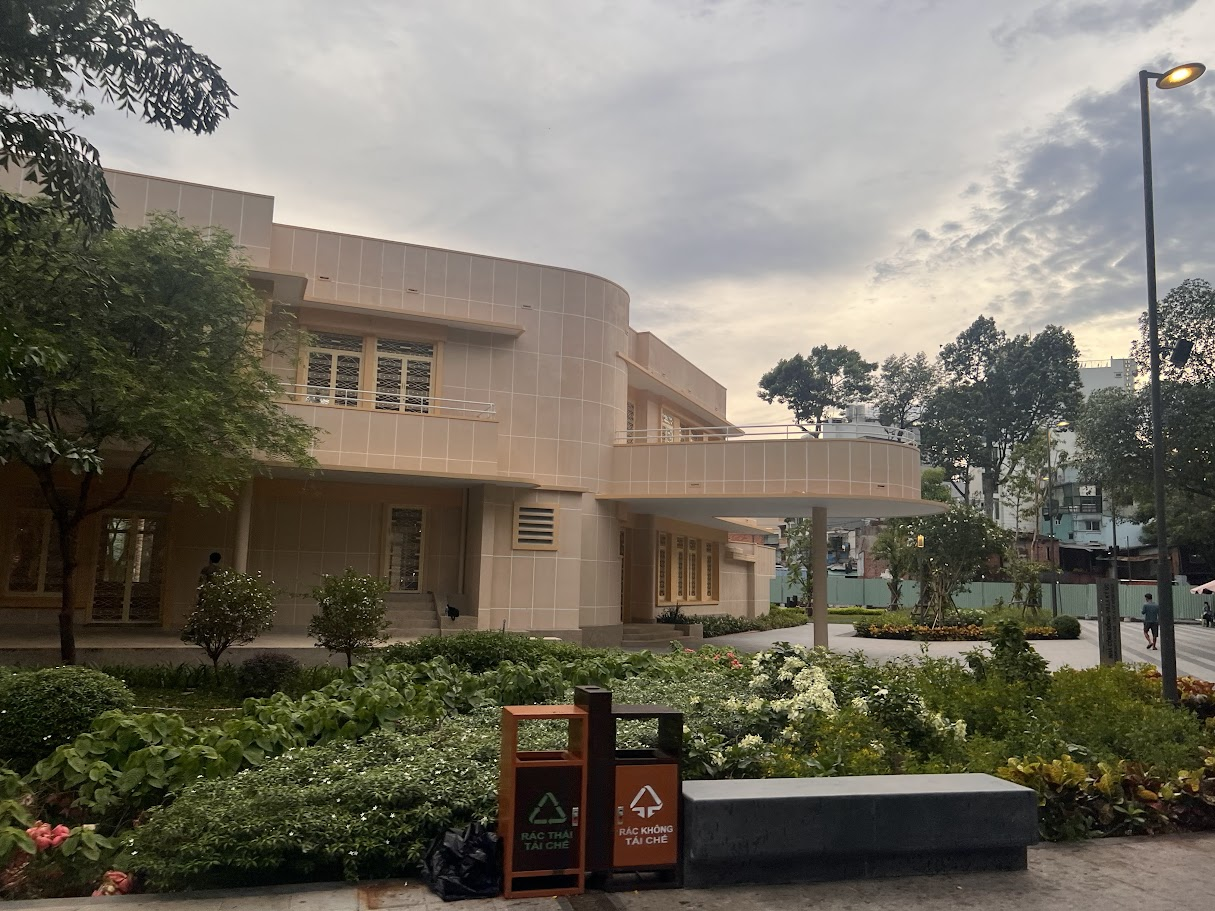
A remaining villa at No. 1 Lý Thái Tổ Park

In November 2025, the city government stated that there are seven old building in the site. Of which, three buildings (no. 2, 3 and 4) were seriously degraded and 4 remaining buildings' main structure were still in good state. The city then approved the demolition of three degraded buildings and the maintenance of four others on the land. On 6 December 2025, the Construction Department was assigned to directly manage the park conversion project to completion. The park project started in early November 2025 and was privately funded, with a budget of 263 billion VND.

Vietnam's Sun Group funded full the project and also directly participated in the construction; and many domestic and foreign consultants were invited to participate in the project. At this time, the project was one of nine key public projects on developing green space and community space in Ho Chi Minh City. The project was completed in more than 90 days and the park was inaugurated before the Lunar New Year of the Horse 2026.

== Design and features ==
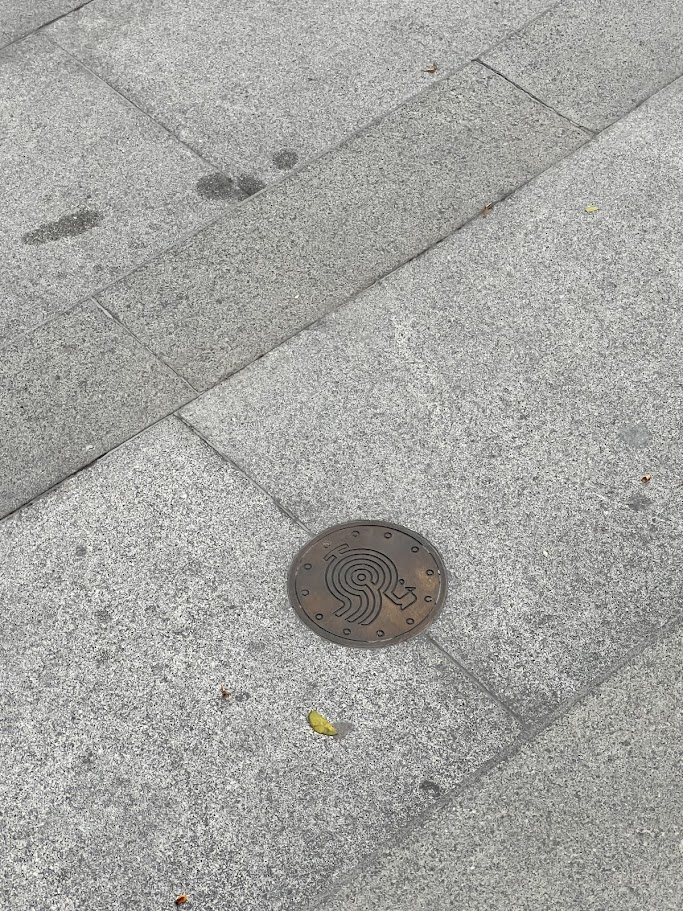
Round pavement relief depicting a rooster zodiac inscription.

The park was planned on a triangular site, with softly rounded path and edges. At the center is a round plaza of about 1,800 m^{2} (19,000 sq ft) featuring a mirror-polished stainless-steel monument inspired by the image of a water droplet falling to the ground. The area around the Water Drop Monument was lowered by about 4 m; the excavated soils was used to build up nearby landscape features.

The Water Drop Monument is 6 m high and 13 m in circumference and installed on an east-west axis. The monument's surface is made of mirror-polished stainless steel which reflects the image of people standing near the monument. The monument also features a heart image inside the water-drop structure. Surrounding the monument are nine steps and 360 water candles.

At night, the area uses the water candles together with nearly 1,000 lights to make a light show. The steps around the monument have three levels: the lowest level is engraved with the 12 zodiac animals, the middle level has stone footprints with inlaid quotes, and the highest level is inlaid with bronze images of lotus, plumeria, and chrysanthemum flowers. The path around the reflecting pool has inscriptions naming many large cities of the world with large numbers of COVID-19 victims; the basin base and the steps have quoted lines associated with memories of the Covid-19 pandemic.

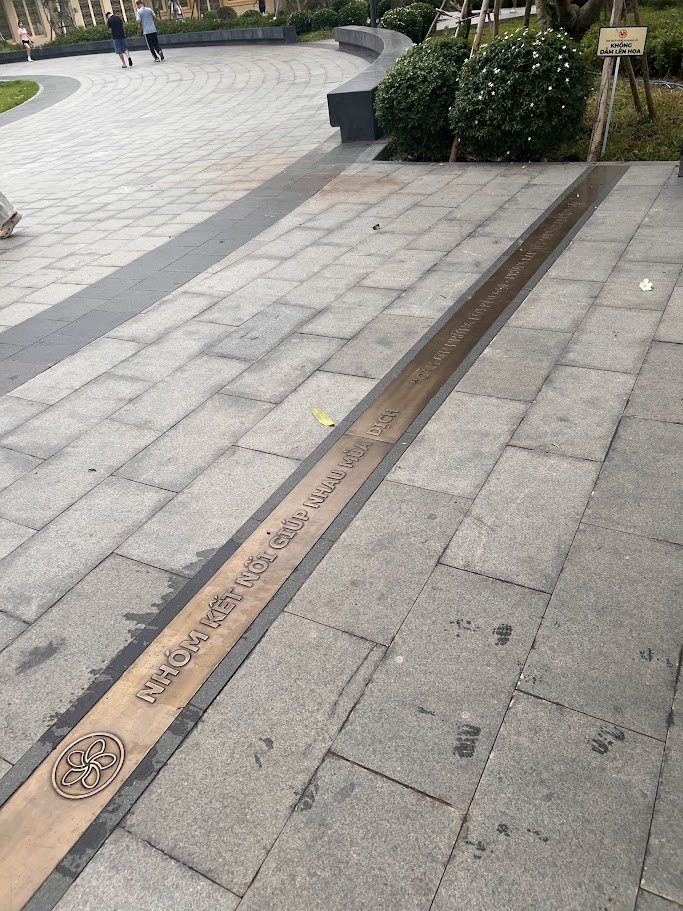
Memorial inscription at No. 1 Lý Thái Tổ Park.

The park preserved many mature trees on the site and renovated several existing buildings for community use. Mature trees in the park belong to the dipterocarp, rain tree, copper pod, tropical almond, and flamboyant groups; in front of each of these trees are brief scientific information panels in both Vietnamese and English. Inside the park are a sports areas and a display area with images of doctors, medical workers, officials, soldiers, and volunteers active during the COVID-19 outbreak. The park also has community activity spaces, a sculpture garden, a library, and exhibition space.

The grounds also include grass mounds, lawns, lookout huts, and a community house. The former remaining villa buildings in the park were retained and renovated for uses such as restaurants, community house, public library, exhibition-museum space, and public restrooms.

== Activities and use ==
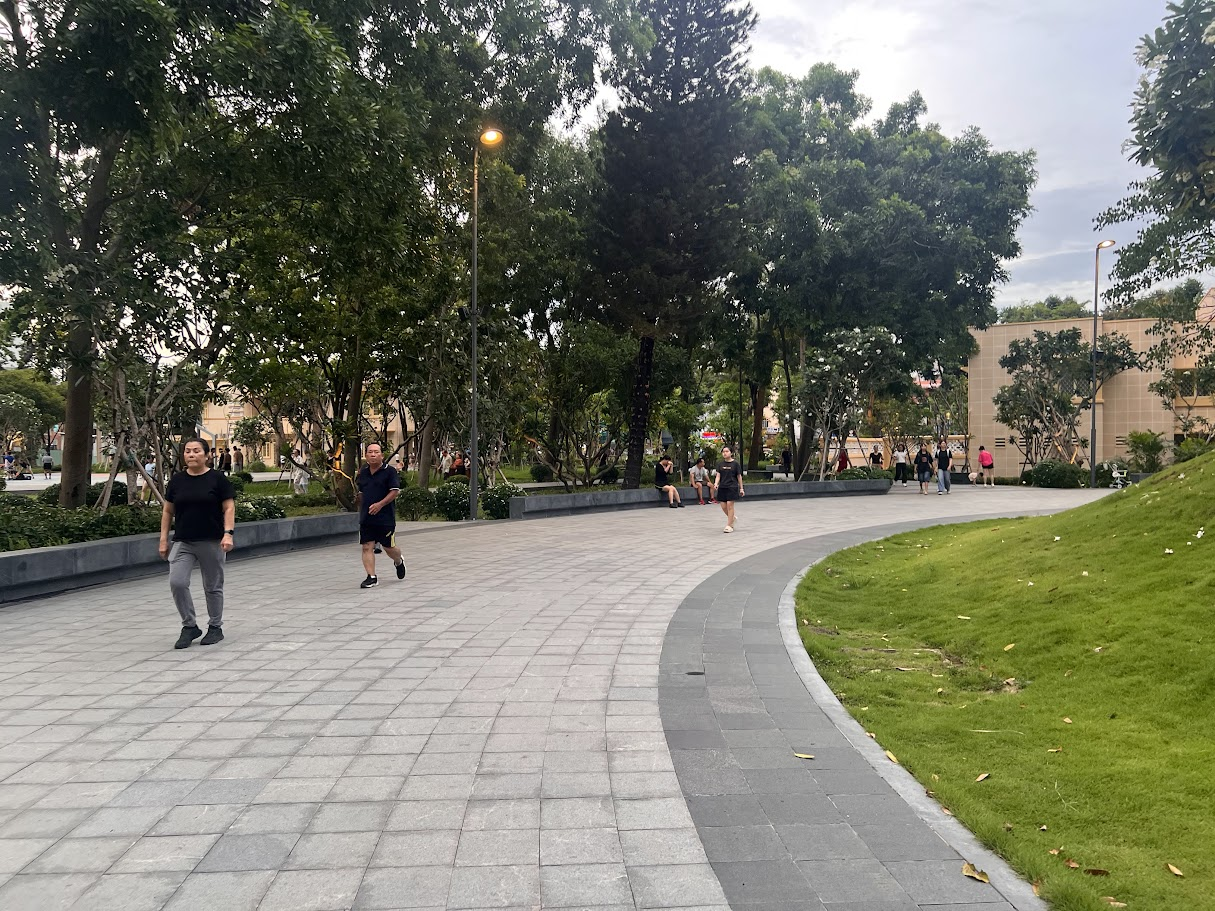
Walkway and landscaped green space at No. 1 Lý Thái Tổ Park.

During the 2026 Lunar New Year, the park hosted a spring flower festival covering more than 4 hectares. After opening, the park was used by residents and visitors for meetings, visits, recreation, and community activities. In the exhibition space, many visitors stopped to commemorate compatriots and soldiers who died during the COVID-19 pandemic.

By March 2026, the Water Drop Monument began hosting musical water fountain shows for city residents. These shows are held daily in the morning, in the evening and at night. Each show lasts about 3-4 minutes of water jets, music and lighting. The park also has signs reminding visitors to protect trees and flowers and maintain general cleanliness, two-compartment waste bins placed at many locations, and a free two-wheeler parking area.

== Adjacent projects ==
The adjoining site of No. 2 Hùng Vương, currently occupied by an office of Vietnam Posts and Telecommunications Group, is also listed to use for the park. In January 2026, VNPT transferred a land portion totaling 800 m^{2} (8,600 sq ft) to the park. The Construction Department had proposed to include the remaining 4,200 m^{2} (45,000 sq ft) of the No. 2 Hùng Vương site to use in the next phase of completing the park. In 2026, Ho Chi Minh City began a road-widening and renovation project on the section of Trần Bình Trọng Street adjoining No. 1 Lý Thái Tổ Park. With a budget of more than 985 billion VND, this street will be widened to 23 m and have its electricity and telecommunications utilities moved underground.
