= Ấn Quang Pagoda =

Meeting place in Ho Chi Minh City, Vietnam

Coordinates: 10°45′57″N 106°40′18″E

- Chùa Ấn Quang
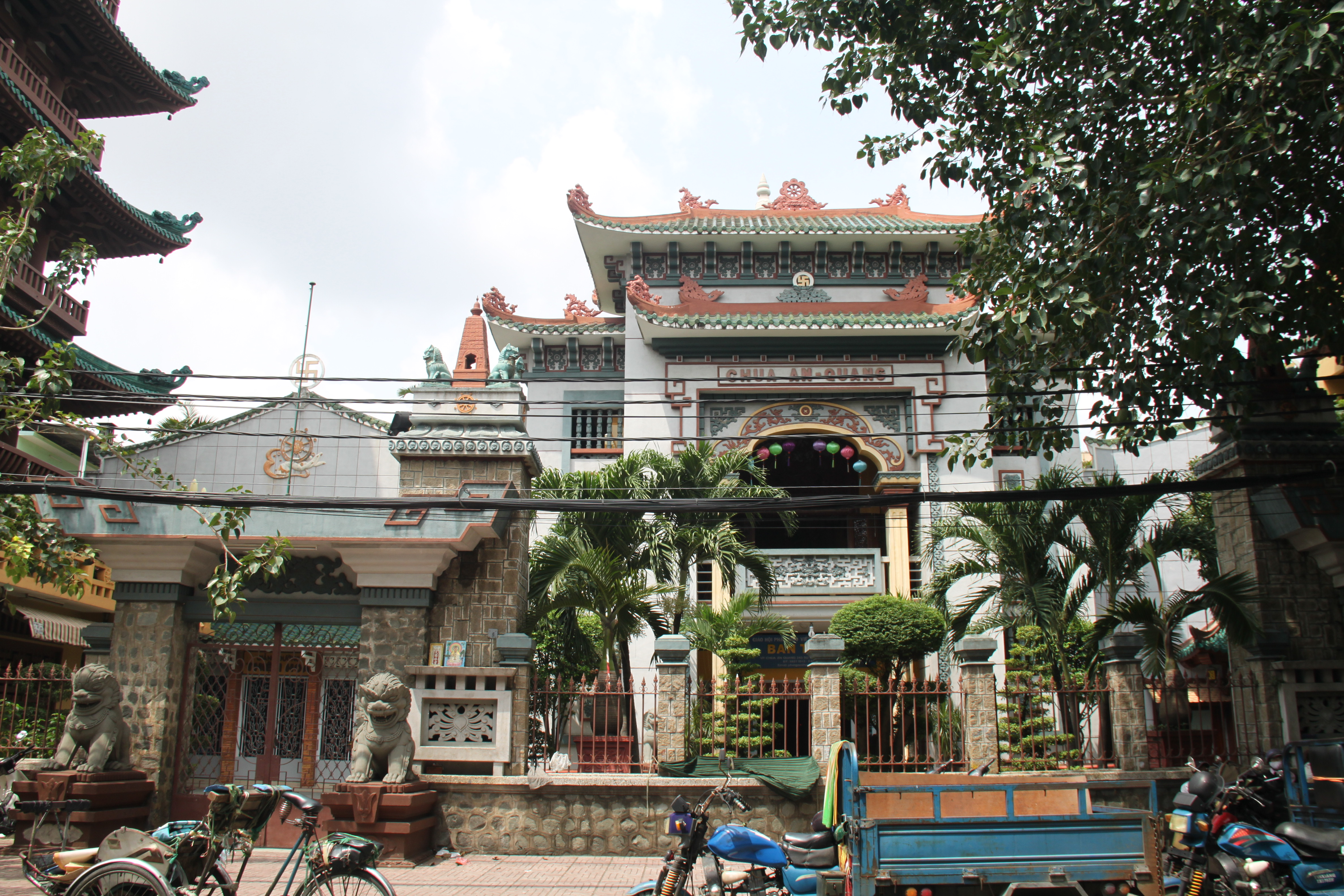
- Ấn Quang Pagoda

Religion
- Affiliation: Buddhism

Location
- Location: 243 Đ. Sư Vạn Hạnh, Vườn Lài ward, Ho Chi Minh City
- Country: Vietnam
- Interactive map of Ấn Quang Pagoda

Ấn Quang Pagoda (Vietnamese: Chùa Ấn Quang, chữ Hán: 印光寺, meaning: "Pagoda of the Light of the (Dharma) Seal") in Master Vạn Hạnh Street (Đường Sư Vạn Hạnh) is a meeting place for Vietnamese Buddhist leaders in Ho Chi Minh City and is a site of the Institute for Dharma Propagation. It has been at the focus of development of modern Vietnamese Buddhism as the seat of the School of Buddhist Studies and the headquarters of the Unified Buddhist Church of Vietnam.

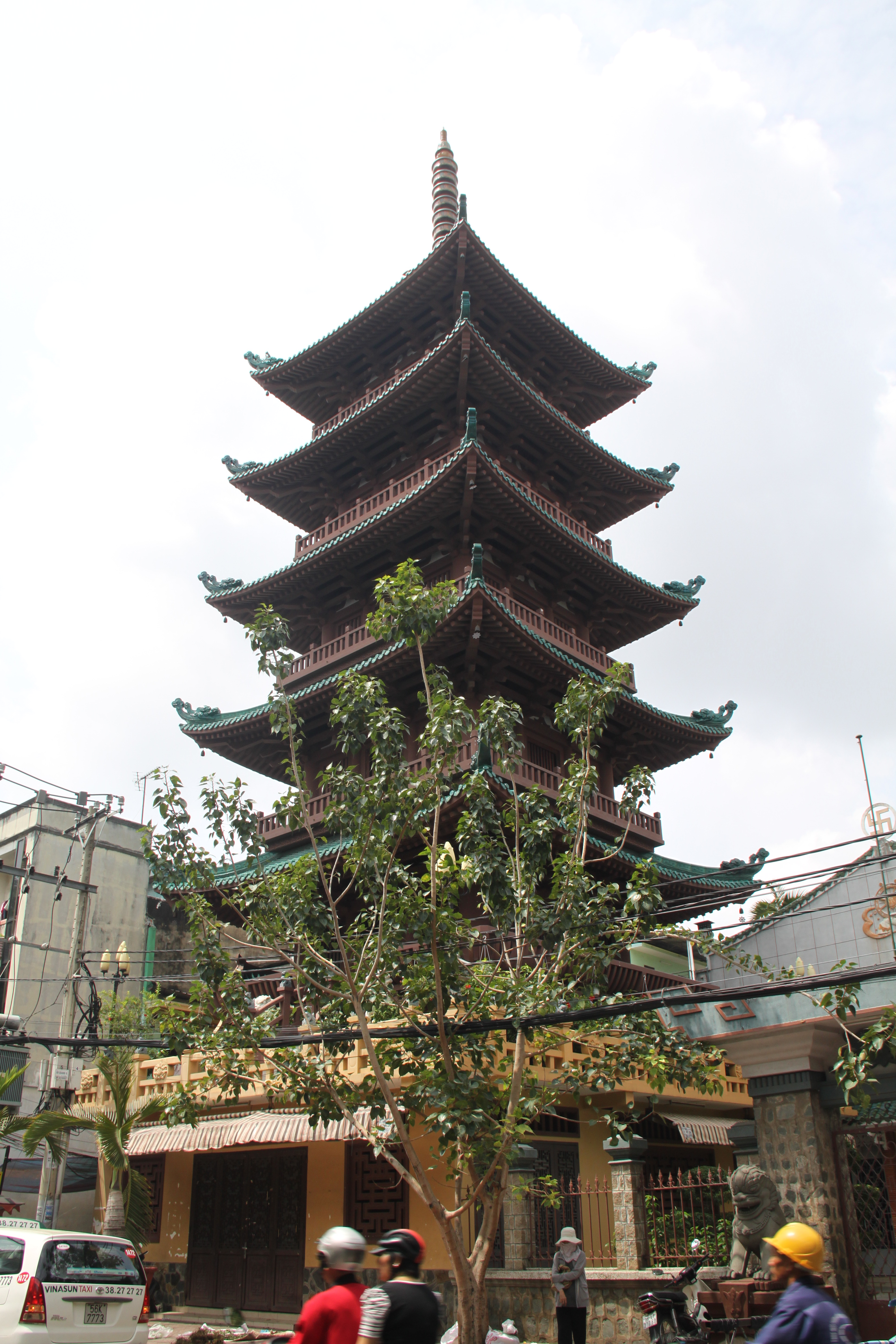
The tower in Ấn Quang Pagoda

Since its founding in 1948, its buildings have been expanded in number and size; they now include a library and a publishing house. But the importance of the pagoda lies in the large number of Dharma teachers who started from this place and the thousands of monks and nuns who received their training there.

Today the pagoda serves as the headquarters of the Ho Chi Minh City Buddhist Sangha and it may serve as a place of reconciliation between the (underground) Unified Buddhist Church of Vietnam (UBCV) and the Communist Party and government who oppose it.

== History ==
The pagoda began in 1948 as a small thatched-roof building of about 500 m², built by the monk Thích Thiện Trí of Linh Ứng Pagoda in Da Nang. It was first named Ứng Quang Tự and served as a school where its founder taught young monks. In 1950, Thích Thiện Hòa returned to Vietnam after studying abroad and took over its management, and he built the main hall modeled on Từ Đàm Pagoda in Huế.

In the same year the pagoda was renamed Ấn Quang and became the seat of the Nam Việt Buddhist School, formed when Thích Trí Hữu merged several schools (Liên Hải, Mai Sơn, Sùng Đức and Ứng Quang). The compound has two gates on Sư Vạn Hạnh Street, and the pagoda has served as headquarters of the Ho Chi Minh City Buddhist Sangha since 1981.
