= Diên Hồng, Ho Chi Minh City =

Diên Hồng Phường Diên Hồng Nguyễn Tri Phương
- Ward
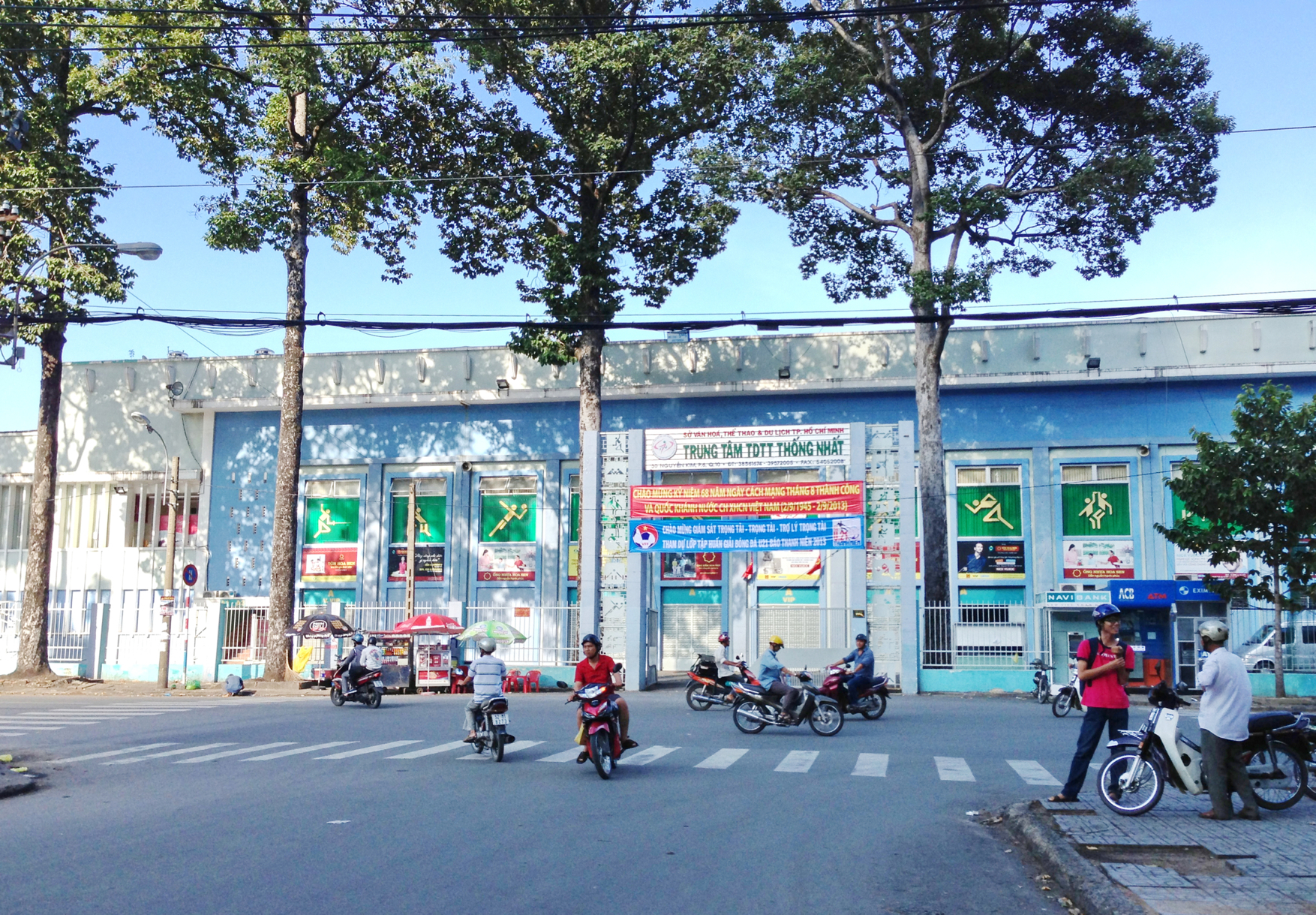
- Thống Nhất Stadium

- Seal

- Location in Ho Chi Minh City

- Location in Vietnam
- Coordinates: 10°45′43″N 106°39′48″E
- Country: Vietnam
- Municipality: Ho Chi Minh City
- Established: 1 July 2025
- People's Committee Headquarters: 474 Ba Tháng Hai St.

Government
  - Party Secretary: Lê Văn Minh
  - Leader of People's Committee: Nguyễn Trường Sơn
  - Leader of People's Council: Lê Văn Minh

Area
  - Total: 0.72 sq mi (1.86 km^{2})

Population (2024)
  - Total: 75,663
  - Density: 40.662/sq mi (15.700/km^{2})
- Time zone: UTC+07:00 (Indochina Time)
- Administrative code: 27169

Diên Hồng (Vietnamese: Phường Diên Hồng) is a ward of Ho Chi Minh City, Vietnam. It is one of the city's 168 new wards, communes and special zones following the 2025 Vietnamese administrative reforms.

== History ==
=== Prior to 1975 ===
Under French rule, the territory of modern-day Diên Hồng was originally part of the hamlet (or village) of Hòa Hưng, located in the former Dương Hòa Thượng canton of Gia Định province. Eventually, majority of Hòa Hưng was merged with the neighboring village of Thạnh Hòa to form the newly-established village of Chí Hòa, the remainder portion being integrated into the Sài Gòn-Chợ Lớn area instead.

By 1942, the Sài Gòn-Chợ Lớn area was divided into 18 districts (hộ), with the majority of modern-day Diên Hồng now situated in Chợ Lớn's District 6. In early 1952, under the State of Vietnam's Dispatch No. 104-NV, the 18 districts were then rearranged & merged into 7 urban districts (quận), of which modern-day Diên Hồng was now located in District 4.

In 1959, Saigon's districts were once again rearranged under a decree issued by the South Vietnamese government, leading to the establishment of Nguyễn Tri Phương ward, which became part of District 10 in 1969. It is said that the outline of modern-day Diên Hồng closely resembles that of this former ward.

=== Post 1975 ===
By 1976, Nguyễn Tri Phương ward was dissolved amidst a series of reforms under Resolution 301/UB under the Provisional Revolutionary Government of the Republic of South Vietnam, in favor of 25 new wards under District 10.

On 14 February 1987, under Resolution 33-HĐBT of the Council of Ministers, the wards 16, 11, and 20 (which make up modern-day Diên Hồng) were rearranged and renamed to wards 6, 8, and 14, respectively.

On 16 June 2025, the National Assembly Standing Committee issued Resolution No. 1685/NQ-UBTVQH15 on the arrangement of commune-level administrative units of Ho Chi Minh City in 2025 (With "Article 1" coming into effect on 1 July 2025). Accordingly, the entire land area and population of Ward 6, Ward 8 and a majority of Ward 14 of the former District 10 was integrated into a new ward named Diên Hồng (Clause 25, Article 1).

== Geography ==
Diên Hồng is located near Ho Chi Minh City's geographic center, adjacent to:

- Tân Hòa ward to the north by Bắc Hải Road
- Chợ Lớn and An Đông ward to the south by Nguyễn Chí Thanh Street
- Hòa Hưng and Vườn Lài to the east by Thành Thái - Nguyễn Tri Phương Boulevard
- Phú Thọ ward to the west by Lý Thường Kiệt Street

According to Dispatch No. 2896/BNV-CQĐP (on 27 May 2025) of the Ministry of Home Affairs, following the merger, Diên Hồng has a total land area of 1.86 km², and a total population of 75,663 (as of 31 December 2024) – making its population density roughly 40.662/km².

=== Administrative divisions ===
Diên Hồng is divided into 38 neighborhoods (khu phố), numbered from '1' to '38' (excluding '13', which is instead referred to as '12A').

== Attraction ==
=== Famous landmarks ===
Name	Address	Notes
Thống Nhất Stadium (lit. 'Unification Stadium')	138 Đào Duy Từ	
Thống Nhất Stadium (lit. 'Unification Stadium')	30 Nguyễn Kim	Gate A
Quang Trung Monument	Kỳ Đài Quang Trung Walking Street	"Quang Trung Monument" Night Market

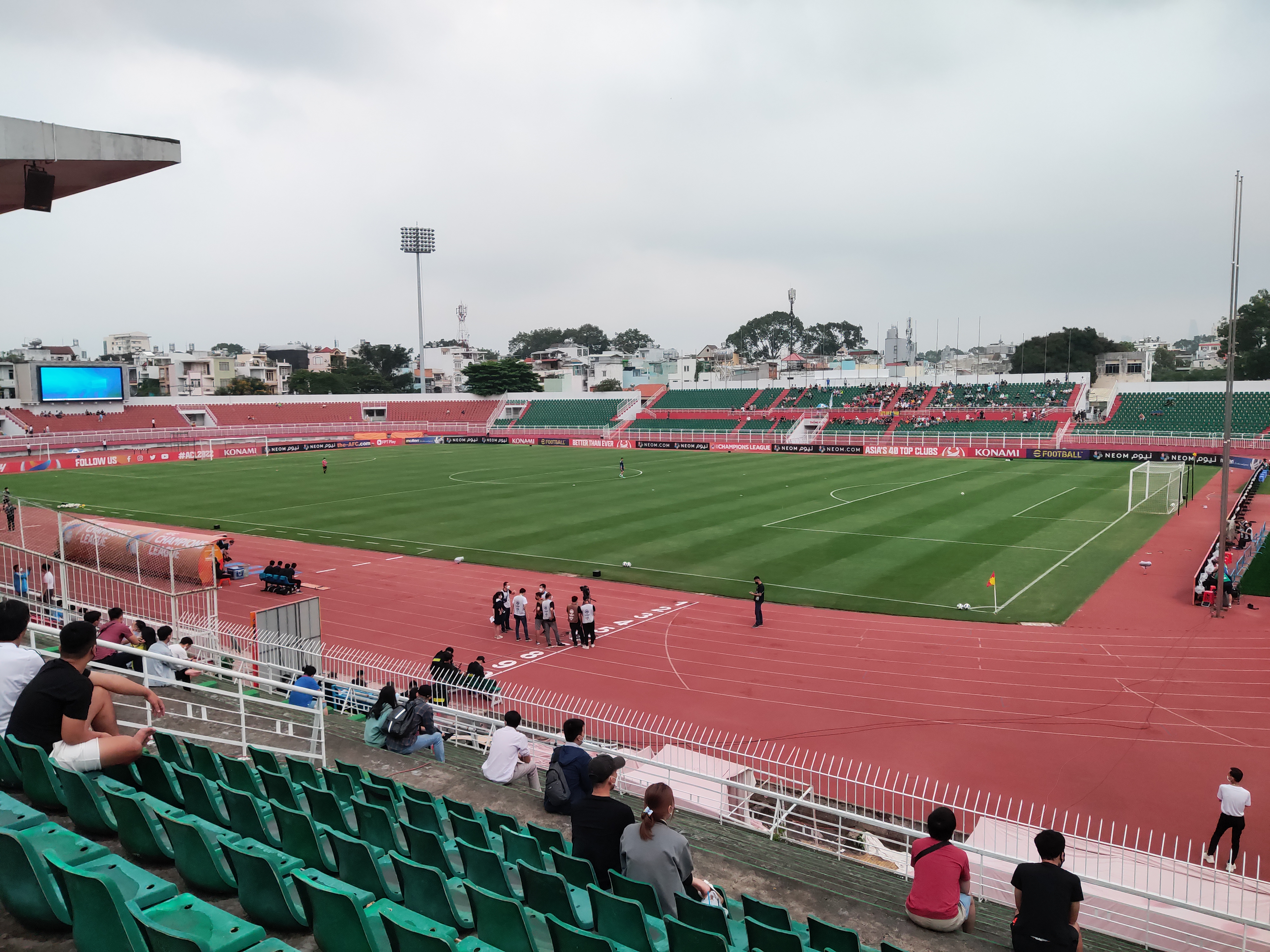
Thống Nhất Stadium

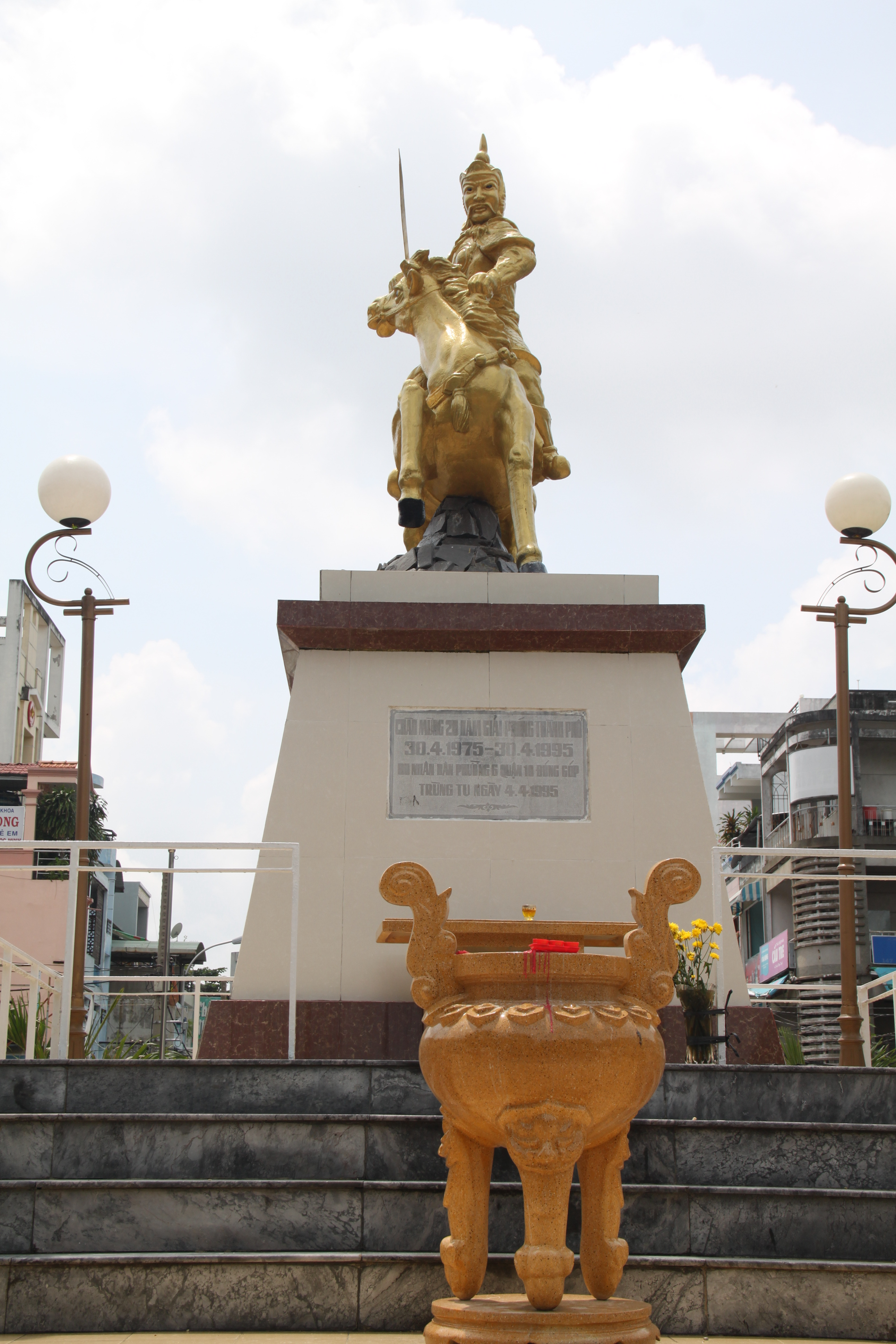
Quang Trung Monument

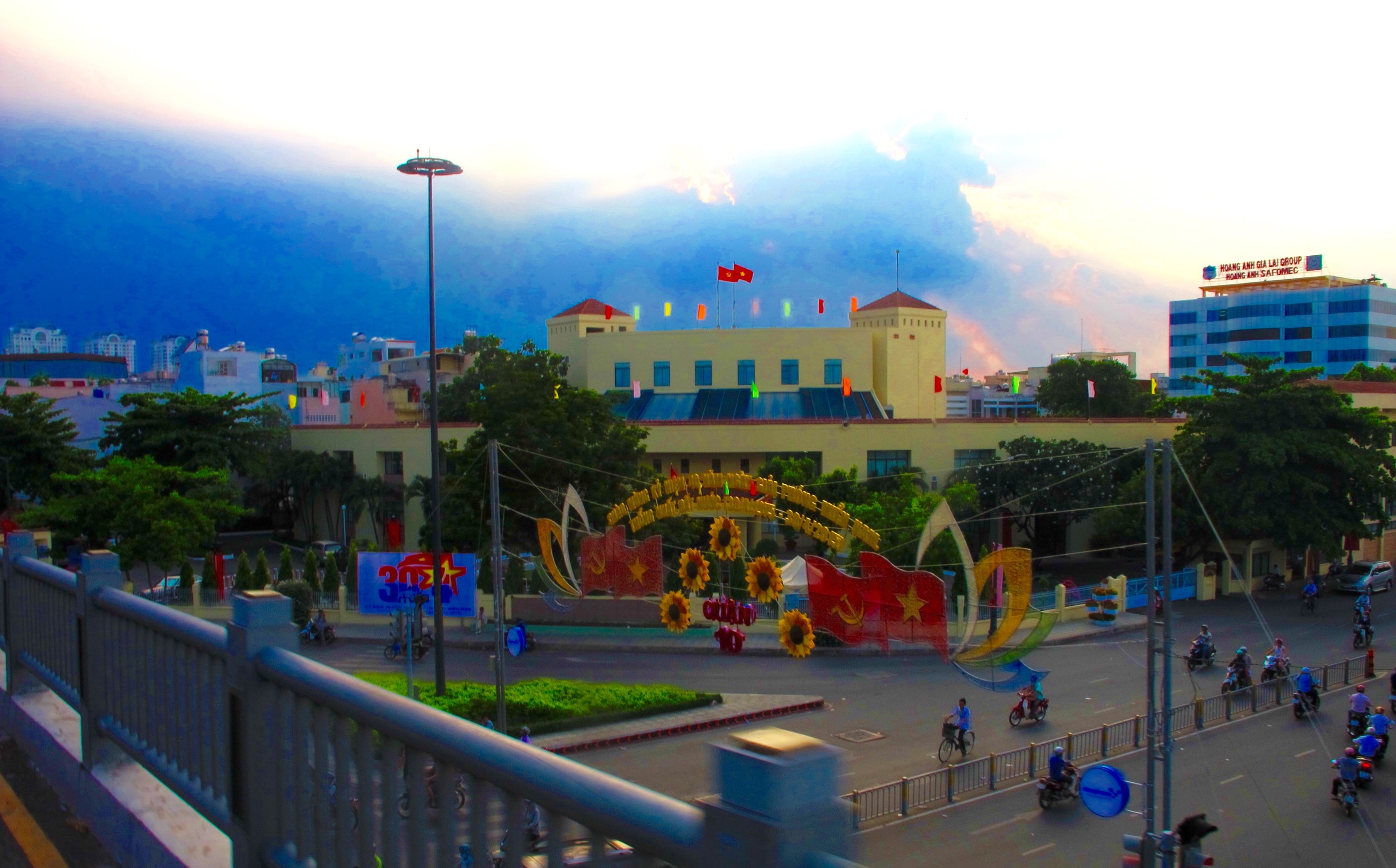
People's Committee of Diên Hồng Ward, viewed from a distance

== Government ==
Headquarters	Address
The People's Committee & People's Council of Diên Hồng Ward	474 Ba Tháng Hai St.
People's Police of Diên Hồng Ward	592 Bà Hạt St.

== Healthcare ==
Name of healthcare centre	Address	Notes
STO Oriental Hospital (Bệnh viện STO Phương Đông)	79 Thành Thái	
Trưng Vương Hospital (Bệnh viện Trưng Vương)	266 Lý Thường Kiệt	
Diên Hồng Ward Medical Station (Trạm Y tế phường Diên Hồng)	Main location: 397 Tô Hiến Thành	Currently has a total of 5 locations (điểm y tế); 1 main và 4 additional. Corporate structure consists of 1 director, 1 vice director, and 66 medical employees specializing across 6 departments.

== Education ==
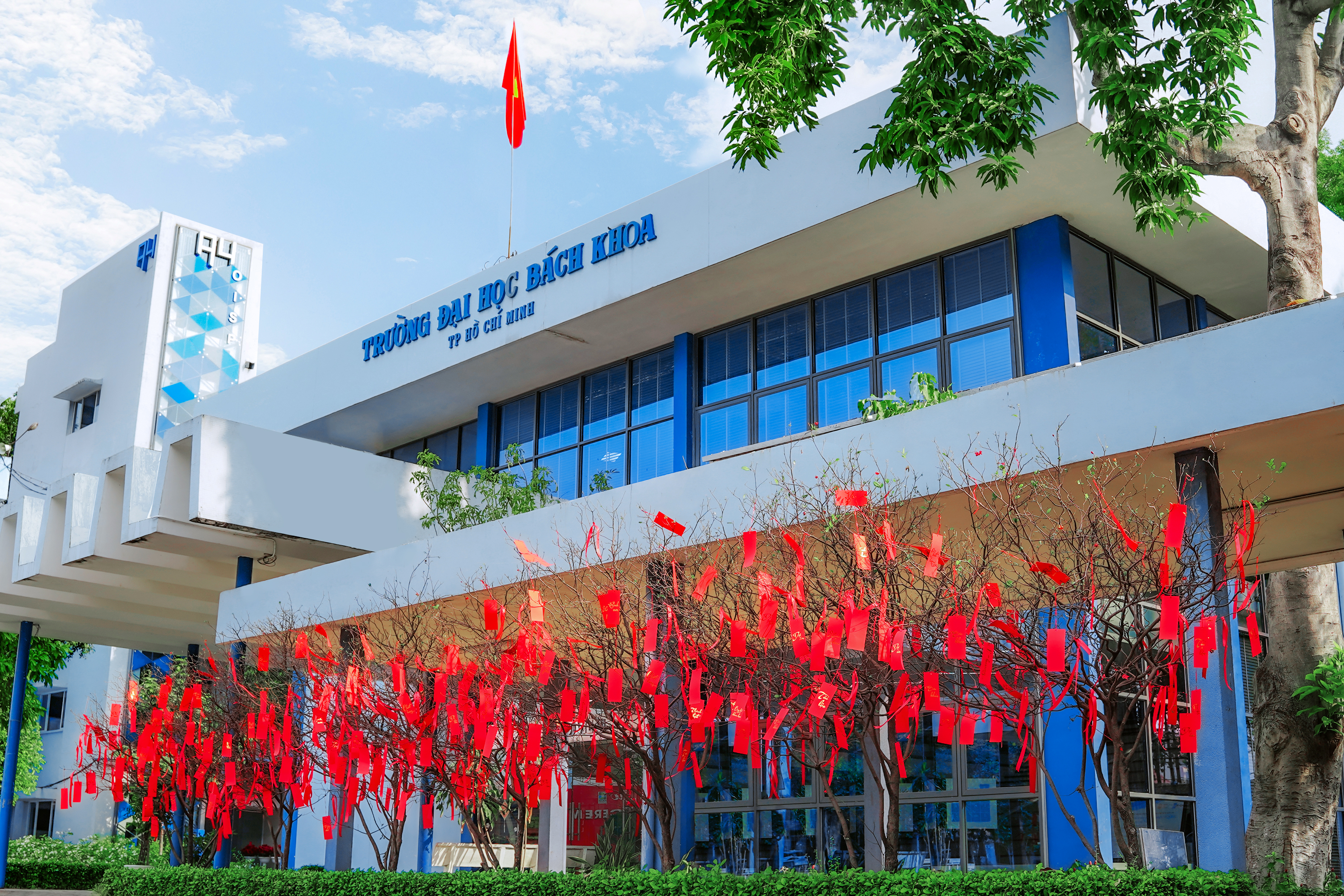
Ho Chi Minh City University of Technology (HCMUT)

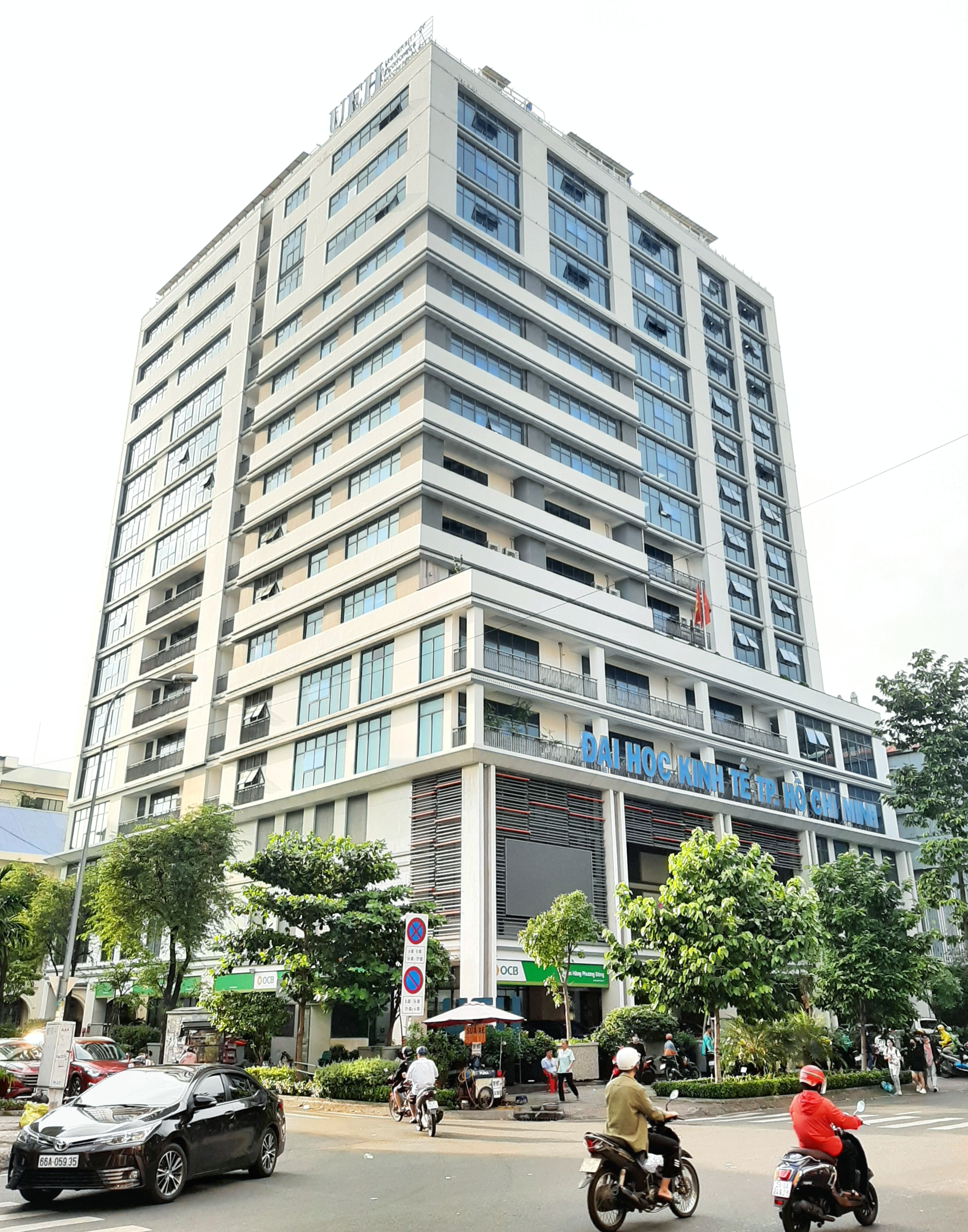
University of Economics Ho Chi Minh City (UEH)

=== Universities (Đại học) ===
Name of institution	Address	Website	Notes
University of Economics Ho Chi Minh City (UEH)	279 Nguyễn Tri Phương		Campus B
Ho Chi Minh City University of Technology (HCMUT)	268 Lý Thường Kiệt		Main Campus
Hoa Sen University	7/1 Thành Thái		Campus 3

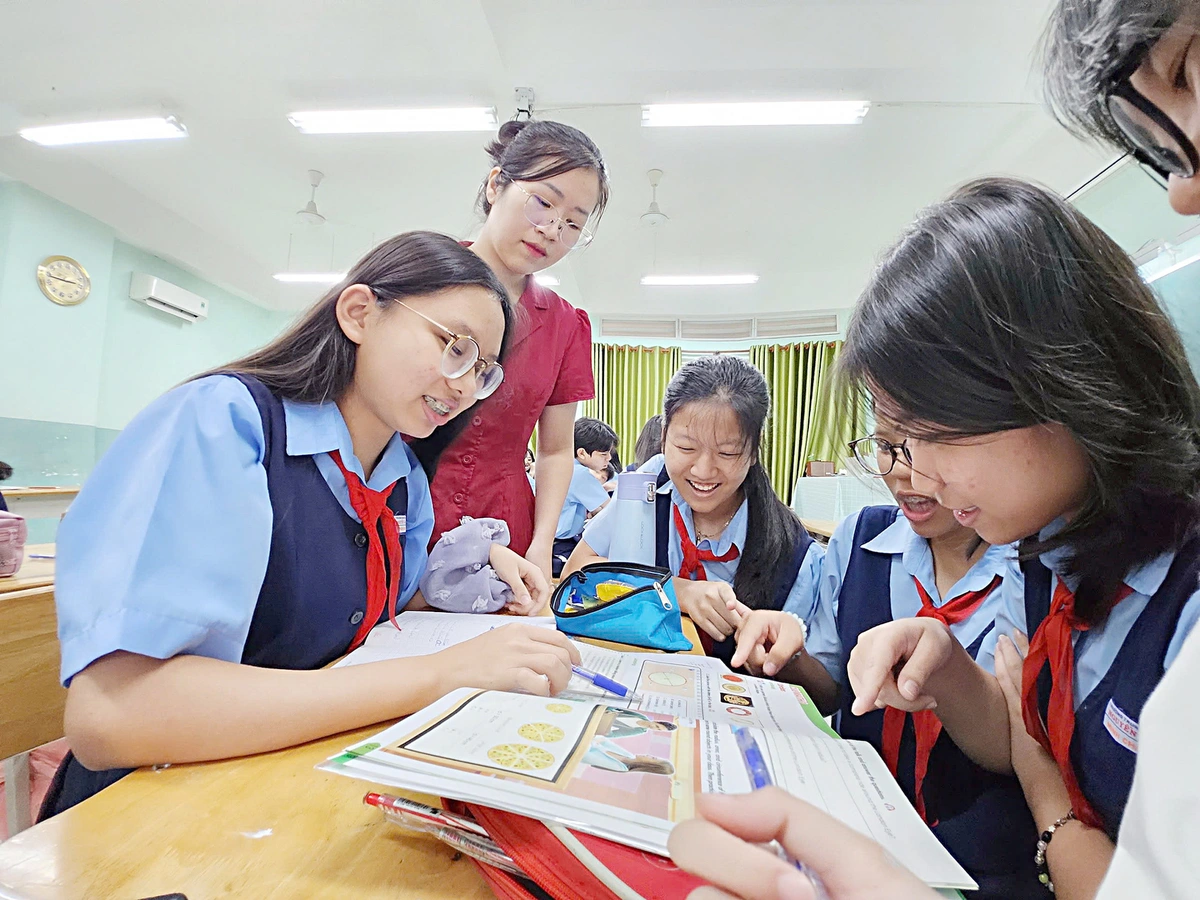
Students from Nguyễn Văn Tố Secondary School

=== High schools (Trung học phổ thông) ===
Name of institution	Address	Website	Notes
Diên Hồng Secondary and High SchoolS (Trường THCS và THPT Diên Hồng)	11 Thành Thái		Public school
Vietnam Australia International School / Vietnam Australia Primary, Secondary & High School (Trường Quốc tế Việt Úc / Trường Tiểu học, THCS, THPT Việt Úc)	594 Ba Tháng Hai		Private school; Ba Tháng Hai campus

=== Secondary schools (Trung học cơ sở) ===
The following list does not include inter-level schools offering high school education.

Name of institution	Address	Notes
Nguyễn Tri Phương Secondary School (Trường THCS Nguyễn Tri Phương)	26 Nguyễn Lâm	Gate A
Nguyễn Tri Phương Secondary School (Trường THCS Nguyễn Tri Phương)	42A Nguyễn Lâm	Gate A
Nguyễn Văn Tố Secondary School (Trường THCS Nguyễn Văn Tố)	140 Tam Đảo	

=== Primary schools (Trường tiểu học) ===
Name of institution	Address
Dương Minh Châu Primary School (Trường Tiểu học Dương Minh Châu)	34 Nguyễn Lâm
Lê Đình Chinh Primary School (Trường Tiểu học Lê Đình Chinh)	7/4 Thành Thái
Nguyễn Chí Thanh Primary School (Trường Tiểu học Nguyễn Chí Thanh)	302 Nguyễn Chí Thanh
Trần Văn Kiểu Primary School (Trường Tiểu học Trần Văn Kiểu)	479 Vĩnh Viễn
Võ Trường Toản Primary School (Trường Tiểu học Võ Trường Toản)	354/74 Lý Thường Kiệt

=== Preschools (Trường Mầm non) ===
Name of institution	Address	Website
2/9 (lit. '2nd of September') Preschool (Trường Mầm non 2/9)	606 Ba Tháng Hai	
Măng Non (lit. 'Young bamboo shoot') 2 Preschool (Trường Mầm non Măng Non 2)	36 Nguyễn Lâm	
Hoa Lan (lit. 'Orchid') Preschool (Trường Mầm non Hoa Lan)	280 Nguyễn Chí Thanh	
Ánh Dương (lit. 'Sunlight / Sunshine') Preschool (Trường Mầm non Ánh Dương)	30 Nguyễn Lâm	
Hoa Anh Đào (lit. 'Cherry blossom') Preschool (Trường Mầm non Hoa Anh Đào)	237 Đào Duy Từ	
Hải Âu (lit. 'Seabird / Seagull') Preschool (Trường Mầm non Hải Âu)	525 Nguyễn Tri Phương	
Hoa Hướng Dương (lit. 'Sunflower') Preschool (Trường Mầm non Hoa Hướng Dương)	7A/43/49 Thành Thái	
