= Vườn Lài =

Vườn Lài Phường Vườn Lài
- Ward
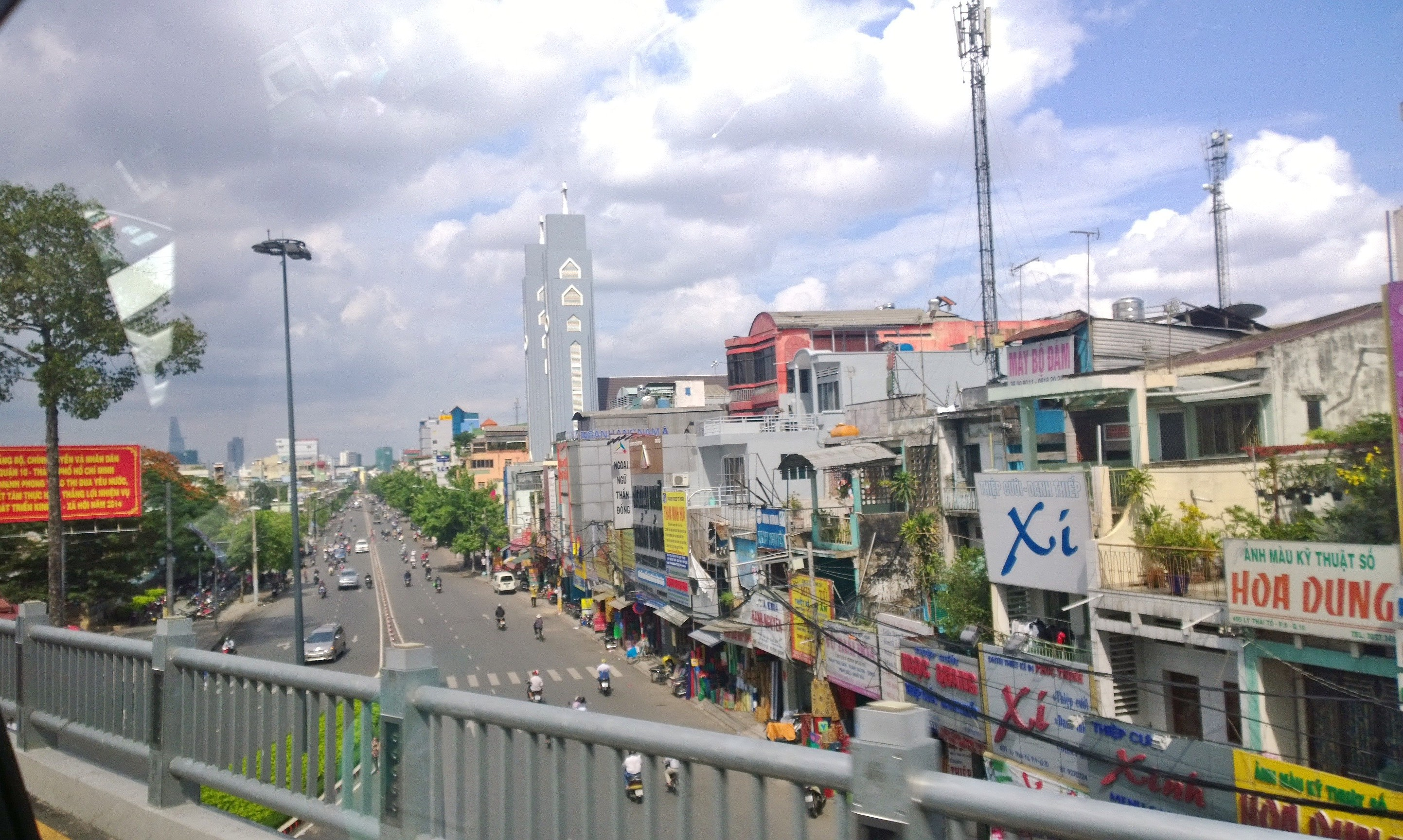
- Lý Thái Tổ Boulevard, as viewed from Ba Tháng Hai Overpass

- Seal
- Interactive map of Vườn Lài
- Country: Vietnam
- Municipality: Ho Chi Minh City
- Established: 1 July 2025

Government
  - Type: 168 Hùng Vương St.
  - Party Secretary: Lâm Hùng Tấn
  - Leader of People's Committee: Huỳnh Văn Tâm
  - Leader of People's Council: Lâm Hùng Tấn

Area
  - Total: 0.49 sq mi (1.28 km^{2})

Population (2024)
  - Total: 104,076
  - Density: 210.59/sq mi (81.309/km^{2})
- Time zone: UTC+07:00 (Indochina Time)
- Administrative code: 27190

Vườn Lài (Vietnamese: Phường Vườn Lài, lit. 'jasmine garden') is a ward of Ho Chi Minh City, Vietnam. It is one of the city's 168 new wards, communes and special zones following the 2025 Vietnamese administrative reforms.

== Etymology ==
During the process of renaming commune-level subdivisions in 2025 (as part of aforementioned reforms), (Note: The local government had opted for the use of formal names for the newly merged wards (which were once part of urban districts) as opposed to numerical abbreviations.) the local government of Ho Chi Minh City had emphasized the use of culturally and/or historically significant names in a local area.

In the case of Vườn Lài, the ward's name had originated from the Vườn Lài Traditional Monument (Bia Truyền thống Vườn Lài), located on the intersection between the roads: Ngô Gia Tự, Sư Vạn Hạnh, and Vĩnh Viễn; otherwise known as the Vườn Lài Junction (Ngã ba Vườn Lài; lit. 'Vườn Lài T-junction').

== History ==
The outline of modern-day Vườn Lài ward is said to resemble that of the former wards of Minh Mạng, Nhật Tảo, and Phan Thanh Giản, which existed as part of District 10 prior to 1975.

On the 14th of February, 1987, the Council of Ministers ratified Decision 33-HĐBT, which enacted the following:

- The merging of District 10's wards 2 & 3 to form 'Ward 2'.
- The renaming of 'Ward 1' to 'Ward 3'.

On the 9th of December, 2020, the National Assembly Standing Committee issued Resolution 1111/NQ-UBTVQH14 on the rearrangement of district-level and commune-level divisions, which integrated approximately 0.10 km² of Ward 3's land area (with a population of 6,075) into Ward 4.

On June 16, 2025, the National Assembly Standing Committee further issued Resolution No. 1685/NQ-UBTVQH15 on the rearrangement of Ho Chi Minh City's commune-level administrative units in 2025 ("Article 1" effective from 1st of July, 2025). Under Clause 26 of Article 1, the entirety of wards 1, 2, 4, 9, and 10 of the former District 10 were to be integrated into a new ward named Vườn Lài (Clause 26, Article 1).

== Geography ==
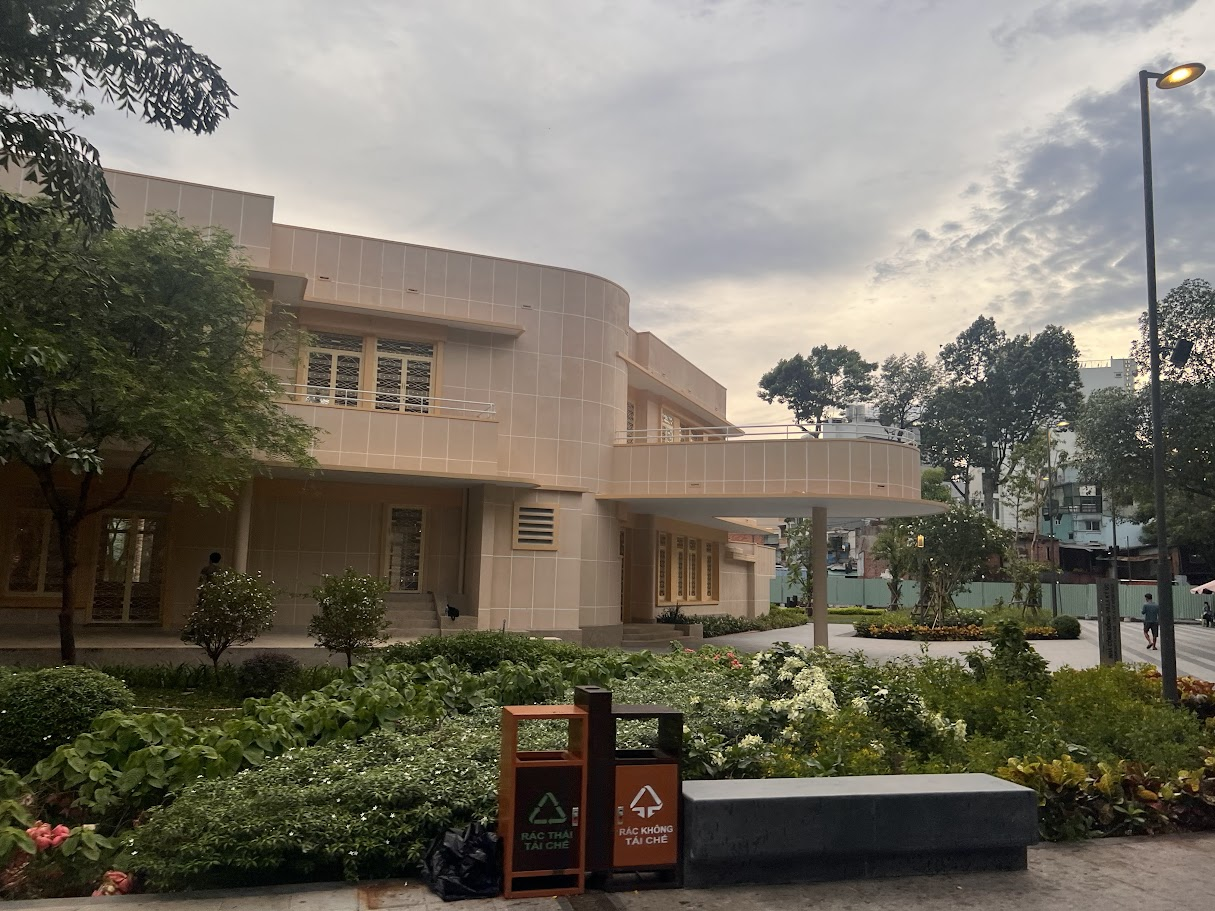
No. 1 Lý Thái Tổ Park

The ward is located around the geographic centre of Ho Chi Minh City, bordered by Xuân Hòa to the east, Bàn Cờ to the southeast, Chợ Quán and An Đông to the south, Diên Hồng to the west, and Hòa Hưng to the north.

According to Official Dispatch No. 2896/BNV-CQĐP (on the 27th of May, 2025) of the Ministry of Home Affairs, following the merger, Vườn Lài ward has a land area of 1.28 km², a total population of 104,076 (as of 31 December 2024) and a population density of 81.309/km².

=== Administrative divisions ===
Vườn Lài is divided into 37 neighborhoods (khu phố), numbered from '1' to '37'.

== Culture ==
=== Famous landmarks ===
Name	Address	Notes
Giác Ngộ Pagoda (Chùa Giác Ngộ)	92 Nguyễn Chí	Places of worship / Religious sites
Ấn Quang Pagoda (Chùa Ấn Quang)	243 Sư Vạn Hạnh	Places of worship / Religious sites
Bắc Hà Church (Nhà thờ Bắc Hà)	419 Lý Thái Tổ	Places of worship / Religious sites
No. 1 Lý Thái Tổ Park	1 Lý Thái Tổ	Main gate
Vườn Lài Traditional Monument / Vườn Lài Memorial (Bia Truyền thống Vườn Lài / Đài tưởng niệm Vườn Lài)	"Vườn Lài Junction"	Namesake of Vườn Lài ward
Hồ Thị Kỷ Floral & Food Scene / "Hồ Thị Kỷ Flowers and Foods Street" (Phố chuyên doanh hoa và ẩm thực Hồ Thị Kỷ)	Hồ Thị Kỷ St. - Alley 60 Hùng Vương	Hồ Thị Kỷ Night Market (Chợ đêm Hồ Thị Kỷ), Hồ Thị Kỷ Flower Market (Chợ hoa Hồ Thị Kỷ)
Vincom Plaza 3/2	107/2A Ba Tháng Hai	

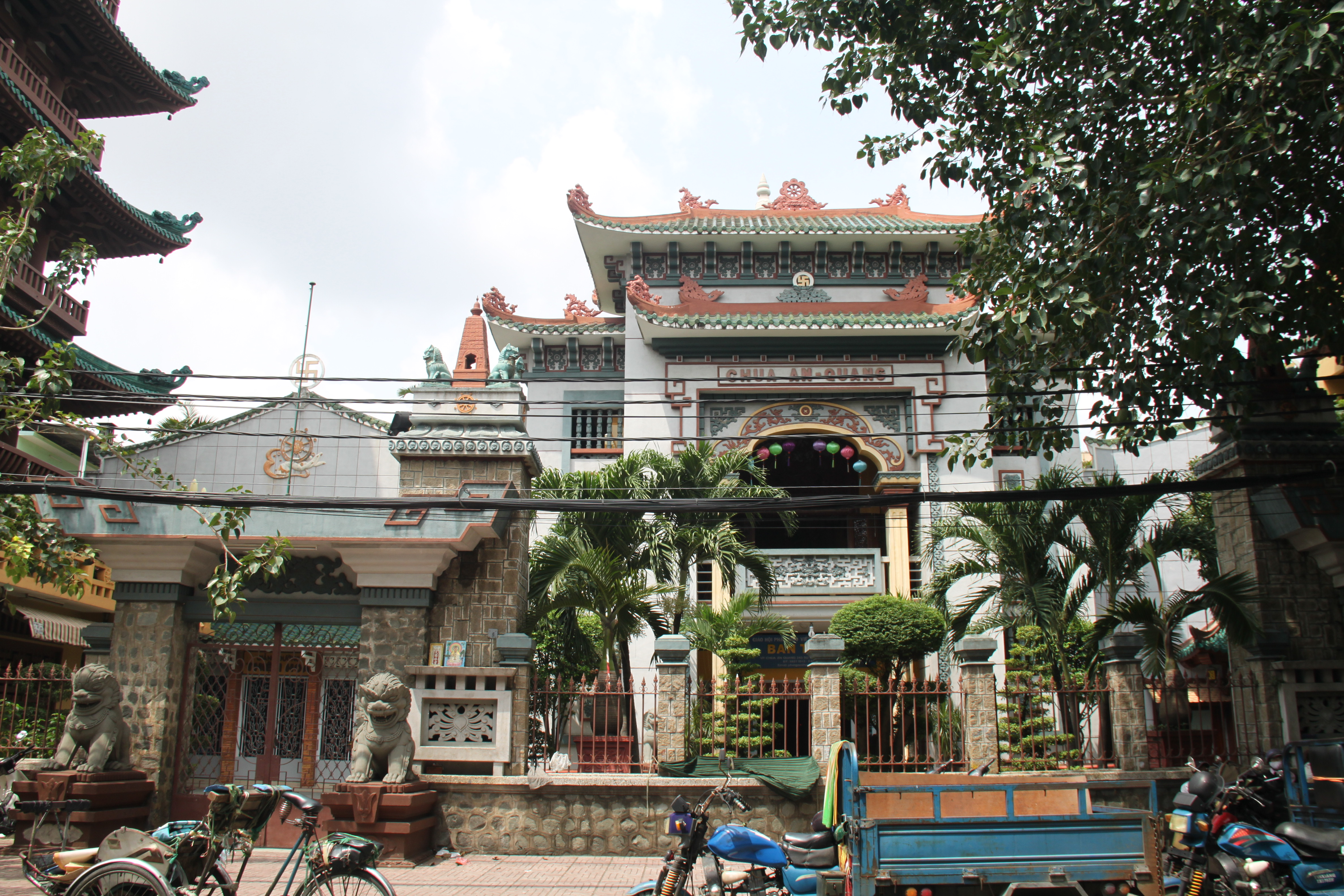
Ấn Quang Pagoda

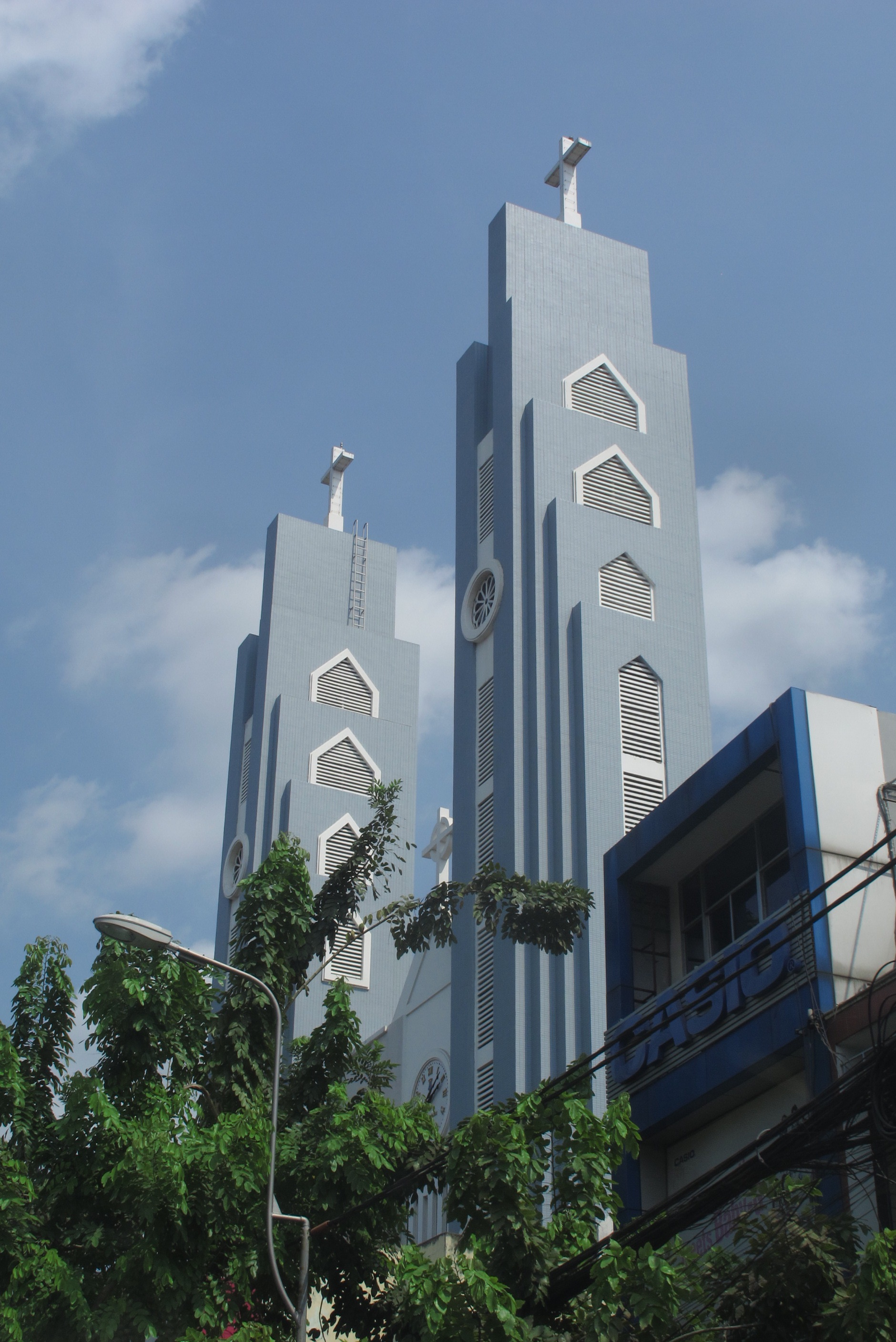
Bắc Hà Church

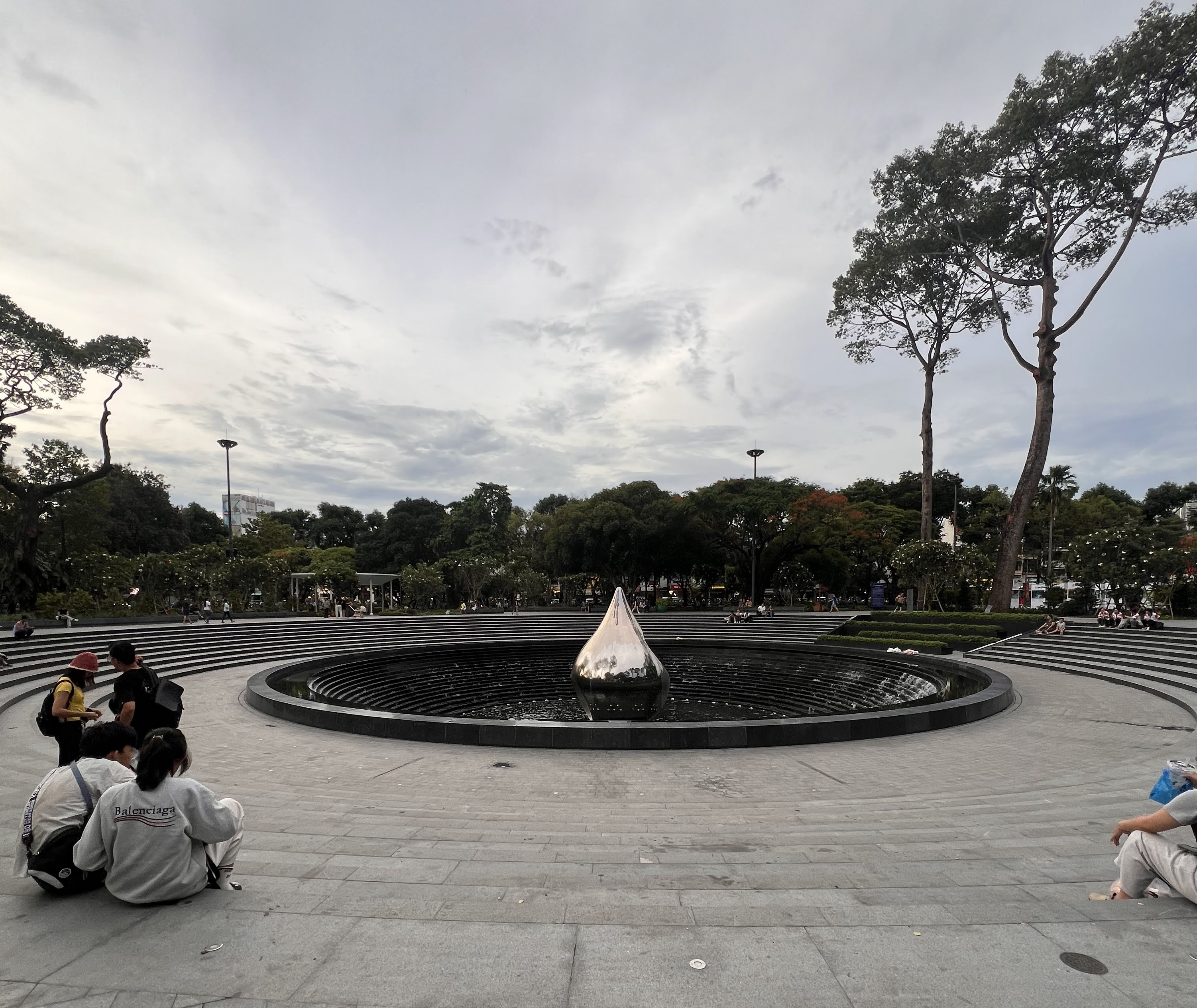
"Tear Drop Monument" at No. 1 Lý Thái Tổ Park

== Government ==
Headquarters	Address	Notes
Party Committee of Vườn Lài Ward	31 Lý Thái Tổ St.	
People's Committee of Vườn Lài Ward	168 Hùng Vương St.	
Vietnam Fatherland Front Committee of Vườn Lài Ward	537-539 Lê Hồng Phong St.	Former headquarters of the Party Committee, People's Committee and Vietnam Fatherland Front Committee of Ward 10 (District 10) prior to reforms.
Office of Infrastructure & Urban Development of Vườn Lài Ward	103-105 Bà Hạt St.	
Office of Culture & Social Affairs of Vườn Lài Ward	410-412 Ngô Gia Tự St.	
People’s Police of Vuờn Lài Ward	528 Lê Hồng Phong St.	

== Healthcare ==
There exists several major healthcare institutes in Vườn Lài ward.

Name of hospital	Address	Website	Notes
Children's Hospital 1 (Bệnh Viện Nhi Đồng 1)	Location 1: 532 Lý Thái Tổ Location 2: 341 Sư Vạn Hạnh		A Children's hospital first established by the South Vietnamese government as the Children's Hospital. In 1978, it was renamed as Children's Hospital 1 to distinguish itself with the Children's Hospital 2 in Bến Nghé which was renamed from the Grall Hospital (also known in Vietnamese as Bệnh viện Đồn Đất). Children's Hospital 1 (Bệnh Viện Nhi Đồng 1) The hospital has been ranked as First-Class by the People's Committee of Ho Chi Minh City, and is currently one of the three tertiary pediatric hospitals serving Southern Vietnam, along with Children's Hospital 2 and the City Children's Hospital (CCH).
Bình Dân Hospital (Bệnh viện Bình Dân)	High Tech Zone: 326 Điện Biên Phủ		A first-class specialized hospital and a central-level hospital, specializing in general surgery, urology, and andrology under the direct management of the Ho Chi Minh City Department of Health. The hospital's head office is located on 371 Điện Biên Phủ St., Bàn Cờ ward.
Hòa Hảo / MEDIC Medical Center (Trung tâm Y khoa Hòa Hảo / MEDIC)	254 Hòa Hảo		
Medical Genetics Institute / MGI (Viện Di truyền Y học)	186-188 Nguyễn Duy Dương		
Saigon Eye Hospital (Bệnh viện Mắt Sài Gòn)	355-365 Ngô Gia Tự		

== Education ==
=== Higher education ===
==== Universities (Đại học) ====
Name of institution	Address	Website	Notes
Ho Chi Minh City University of Economics (Đại học Kinh tế Thành phố Hồ Chí Minh)	91 Ba Tháng Hai		Campus C

==== Colleges (Trường cao đẳng) ====
Name of institution	Address	Website	Notes
Ho Chi Minh City College of Economics (Trường Cao đẳng Kinh tế Thành phố Hồ Chí Minh)	33 Vĩnh Viễn		
National College of Education Ho Chi Minh City (Trường Cao đẳng Sư phạm Trung ương Thành phố Hồ Chí Minh)	182 Nguyễn Chí		Campus 2

=== High schools (Trung học phổ thông / THPT), inter-level schools offering high school education ===
Name of institution	Address	Website
Sương Nguyệt Ánh Secondary & High School (Trường THCS và THPT Sương Nguyệt Ánh)	249 Hòa Hảo	
Nguyễn An Ninh High School (Trường THPT Nguyễn An Ninh)	93 Trần Nhân Tôn	

=== Secondary schools (Trung học cơ sở / THCS) ===
The following list does not include inter-level schools offering high school education.

Name of institution	Address	Website
Hoàng Văn Thụ Secondary School (Trường THCS Hoàng Văn Thụ)	322 Nguyễn Tri Phương	

=== Primary schools (Trường tiểu học) ===
Name of institution	Address
Hồ Thị Kỷ Primary School (Trường Tiểu học Hồ Thị Kỷ)	105 Hồ Thị Kỷ
Nhật Tảo Primary School (Trường Tiểu học Nhật Tảo)	1 Nhật Tảo
Trần Nhân Tôn Primary School (Trường Tiểu học Trần Nhân Tôn)	247 Hòa Hảo
Trần Quang Cơ Primary School (Trường Tiểu học Trần Quang Cơ)	438 Ngô Gia Tự
Trương Định Primary School (Trường Tiểu học Trương Định)	382 Sư Vạn Hạnh
