= Nguyễn Đức Kiên =

Vietnamese businessman

Nguyễn Đức Kiên (born 1964) is a Vietnamese businessman and owner and chairman of the Hanoi ACB football club. In addition he is deputy chairman of the Vietnam Professional Football company (VPF) that now oversees Vietnam’s V-League and First Division football.

In 2011, Kien was named "businessman of the year" by a Vietnamese economic newspaper, Doanh Nhân.

In 2014, he was sentenced to 30 years in prison for conducting illegal business, tax evasion, fraud and intentional wrongdoings.

== Biography ==
Nguyễn Đức Kiên was born and grew up on the outskirts of Hanoi. He attended the Vietnamese University of Military Technology, and then studied at the Zalka Máté Military Technology College (Zalka Máté Kollégium) in Budapest, Hungary, before working for eight years at a state-run textile firm.

In the 1990s, he co-founded the Asia Commercial Joint Stock Bank (ACB), now one of the largest commercial joint stock banks in Vietnam, although he retains less than a 5% interest in the bank. Among his holding are interests in Sacombank, Eximbank, VietBank, the Kien Long Commercial Joint Stock Bank and the Vietnam Export-Import Commercial Joint Stock Bank. His family is the fifth richest in Vietnam, with his personal fortune estimated at over $90 million US dollars.

Kien's primary residence in Hanoi is a three-storey, 500 square meter villa, located on Xuan Dieu Street, Quang An ward, in Tay Ho (West Lake) district.

== Controversies ==
In 2011, Kien was embroiled in controversy when he led the charge to pull clubs out of the Vietnamese football V-League.

On 20 August 2012, Kien was arrested in Hanoi for "economic violations". Kien's arrest was followed by that of Ly Xuan Hai, who had just resigned his position as director general of ACB Bank. In June 2014, the People's Court convicted him for "fraud, tax evasion, illegal trade and 'deliberate wrongdoing causing serious consequences'" and was sentenced to 30 years in prison with a ₫75,000,000,000 fine. Other defendants of the case were sentenced two to eight years, including ACB's former senior director, Ly Xuan Hai, who was sentenced to eight-year prison term.

Kien and other defendants appealed their convictions, but in December 2014, an appellate court upheld them except ACB's former vice chairman Le Vu Ky's, which was reduced from five-year prison to two-year commutation.
