= Nguyen Thien Thuat apartment buildings =

Coordinates: 10.7682°N 106.6788°E

Nguyễn Thiện Thuật apartment buildings
- Chung cư Nguyễn Thiện Thuật
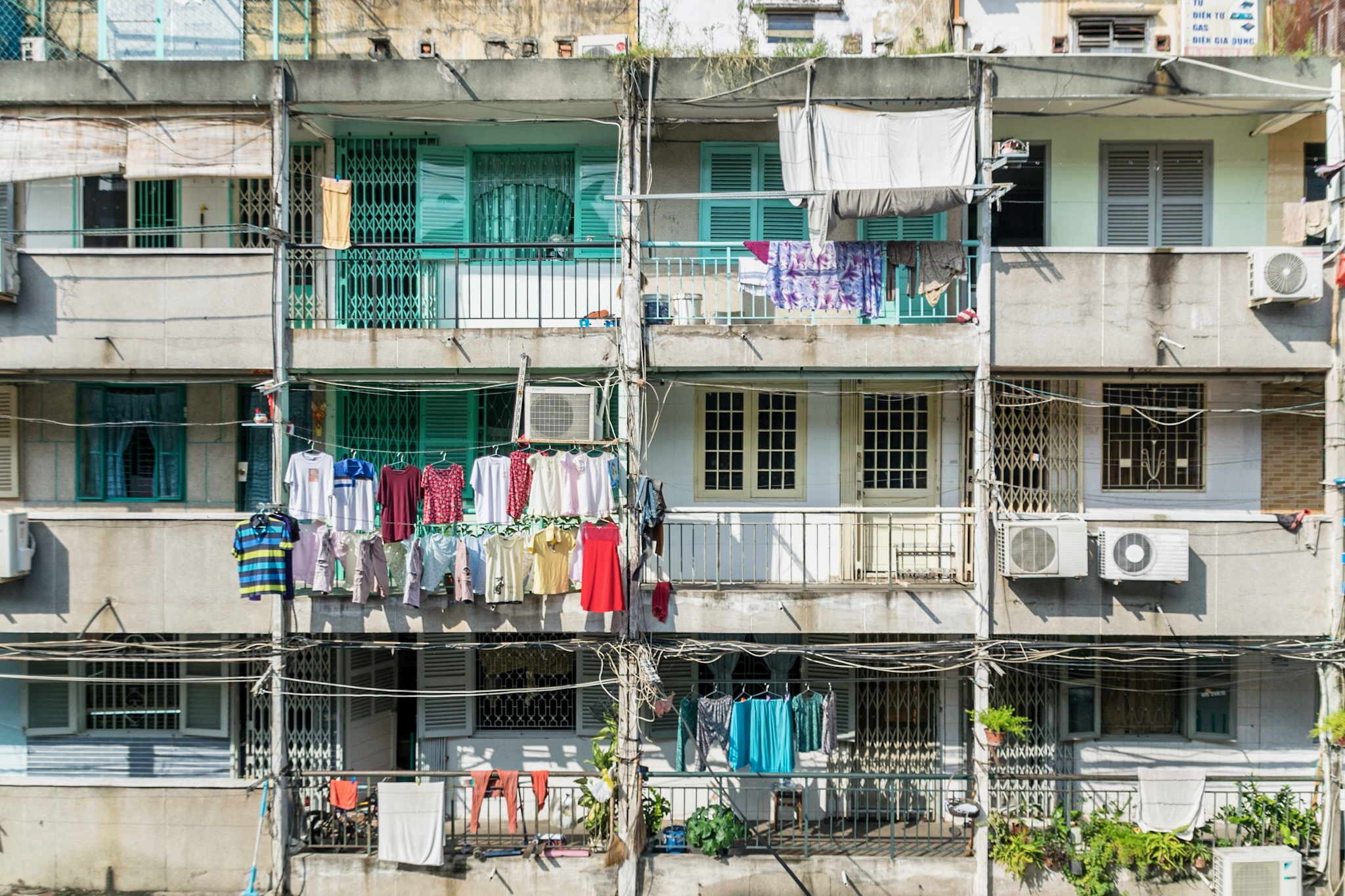
- Interactive map of the Nguyễn Thiện Thuật apartment buildings area

General information
- Location: Nguyễn Thiện Thuật Street, Bàn Cờ, District 3, Ho Chi Minh City, Vietnam
- Construction started: 1968

The Nguyen Thien Thuat apartment buildings (Vietnamese: Chung cư Nguyễn Thiện Thuật) are a complex of American-built historic buildings in Bàn Cờ, District 3, Ho Chi Minh City. The apartments are located on the same name street, a thoroughfare known for its musical instrument shops.

Constructed in 1968 in the aftermath of the Tet Offensive, the apartments originally housed soldiers serving in the US military during the Vietnam War. The apartments are adjacent to Bàn Cờ Market (Vietnamese: Chợ Bàn Cờ) on Nguyen Dinh Chieu street, a large wet market. The area is considered a heaven for street food, and is a popular destination for food tours with many food stores opened in the podium of these buildings. In 2021, the Ho Chi Minh City government proposed demolishing the apartments, which it described as "seriously deteriorated".
