= Ho Chi Minh City University of Technology =

University in Vietnam

Coordinates: 10°46′22″N 106°39′35″E

- Trường Đại học Bách khoa, Đại học Quốc gia Thành phố Hồ Chí Minh
- Type: Public
- Established: 1957; 69 years ago
- Parent institution: Vietnam National University, Ho Chi Minh City
- President: Assoc. Prof. Dr. Mai Thanh Phong
- Faculty: 1,179 (July 2023)
- Students: 26,408 (December 2022)
- Undergraduates: 23,989 (December 2022)
- Location: 268 Lý Thường Kiệt Street, Diên Hồng ward, Ho Chi Minh City, Vietnam
- Campus: Phú Thọ Campus: Urban 14.8 ha (37 acres) Dĩ An Campus: Suburban 26 ha (64 acres)
- Colours: Azure, Blue
- Mascot: None
- Website: hcmut.edu.vn/en (in English)

The Ho Chi Minh City University of Technology (HCMUT; Vietnamese: Trường Đại học Bách khoa, Đại học Quốc gia Thành phố Hồ Chí Minh, lit. 'Polytechnic College, Ho Chi Minh City National University') is a research university in Ho Chi Minh City, Vietnam. HCMUT is a member of Vietnam National University, Ho Chi Minh City. It focuses on high technology and engineering. It is one of the national key universities of Vietnam.

The predecessor of HCMUT was the National Institute of Technology, established in 1957 by the South Vietnam. The institute was renamed National Academy of Technology in 1972. 2 years later, it became one with Thủ Đức Polytechnic University. On October 27, 1976, Prime Minister Pham Van Dong signed Decision No. 426/TTg to make it Ho Chi Minh City University of Technology. In 1996, the university joined the Vietnam National University system. It had more than 20,000 students of undergraduate and graduate level.

== History ==
1957: National Institute of Technology was established by Decree No. 213/GD dated June 29 of the government of the Republic of Vietnam, including 04 schools: Junior college of civil engineering, School of radio waves science, School of maritime transport and freight transport, and School of commerce.

1972: National Institute of Technology was renamed National Academy of Technology according to Decree 135SL/GD dated September 15, 1972.

1973: National Academy of Technology disbanded, the school was renamed University of Technology and later became a member of Thủ Đức Institute of Technology.

1976: The school was named Ho Chi Minh City University of Technology according to Decision No. 426/TTg dated October 27, 1976, with 5 faculties: Civil construction, Electrical engineering, Irrigation science, Mechanical engineering and Chemistry. October 27 has been chosen as the anniversary of HCMUT.

1978: Faculty of Geology was established.

1980: The school began offering doctoral programs according to Decision No. 319-TTg dated December 17, 1980, of the Prime Minister on "Having HCMUT take charge of offering postgraduate programs". It began with offering 20 doctoral programs.

1991: It started offering other postgraduate programs. The Faculty of Irrigation and Construction Engineering was merged into the Faculty of Civil Engineering.

1992: Establishment of Faculty of Industrial Management.

1993: The credit-based assessment system was introduced. It starts the faculty of Computer Science and Engineering, as well as Department of Industrial Arts – the first department under the Board of Presidency in the South.

1996: HCMUT became a member of the Vietnam National University, Ho Chi Minh. The Department of Industrial Arts moved to University of Architecture due to the organizational structure of Ho Chi Minh City National University.

1999: Established Faculty of Environment and Nature Resources.

2000: Established Faculty of Transportation Engineering.

2001: Established Faculty of Materials Technology.

2003: Established Faculty of Applied Science.

2005: HCMUT was awarded the title "Labor Hero in the Reformation Period" by the Government.

2007: HCMUT was awarded Independence Medal by the Government.

September 17, 2007: Office for International Study Programs (OISP) was created to formalize undergraduate and postgraduate student exchange programs.

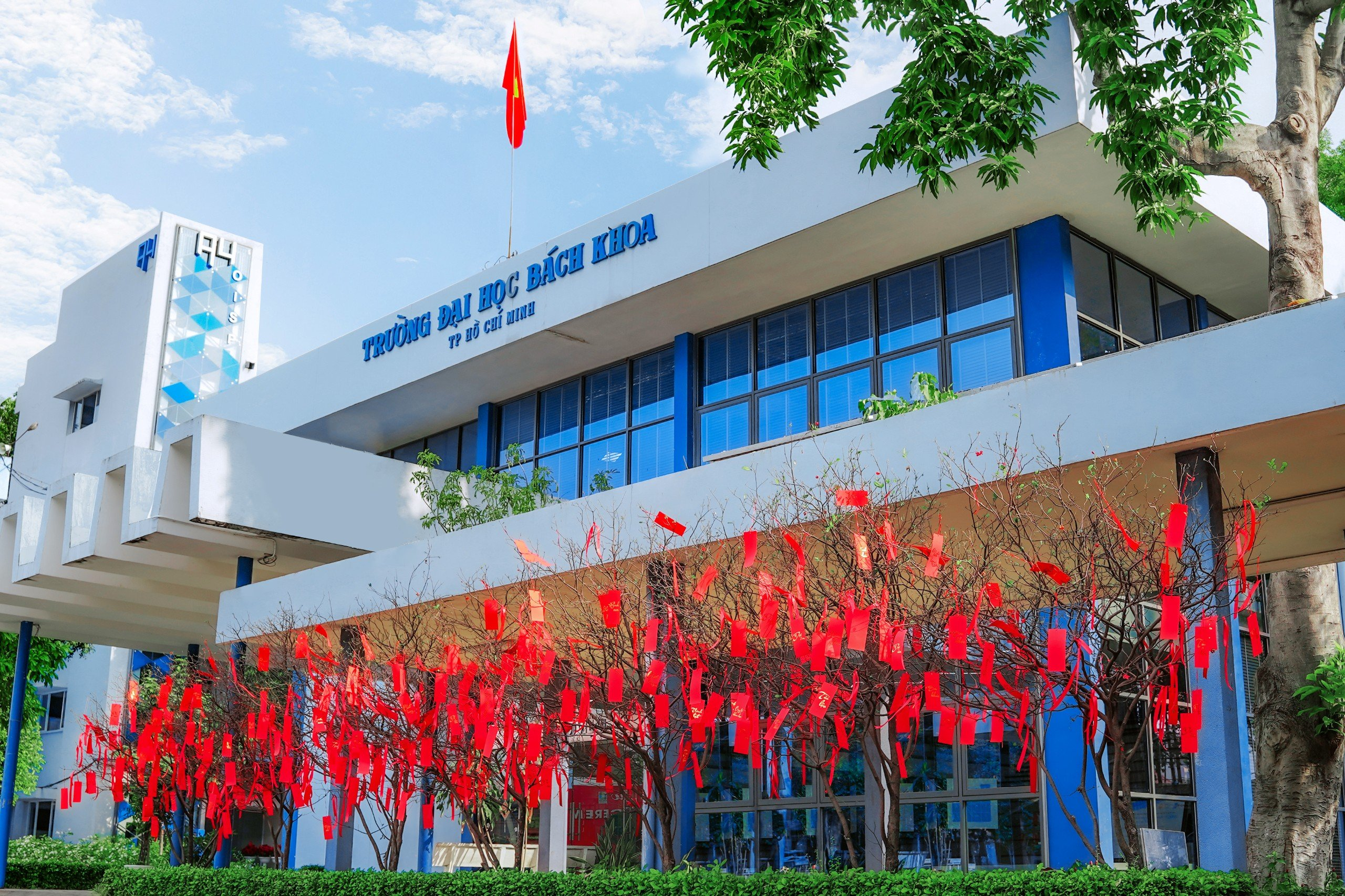
Campus in Lunar New Year

== Faculty, staffs and facilities ==
=== Campuses ===
Campus 1: 268 Lý Thường Kiệt, Diên Hồng, Ho Chi Minh City

Campus 2: HCMC National University Town, Tân Lập Quarter, Đông Hòa, Ho Chi Minh City

=== Teaching staff ===
Total number of lecturers: 624

- Lecturers attained the rank of Professor: 12
- Lecturers attained the rank of Associate Professor: 123
- Lecturers attained Doctorate/Doctor of Science degree: 263
- Lecturers attained Master's degree: 208

(According to information sources up to August 2024)

=== Facilities ===
- Area split into 3 categories (m^{2}): Workplace (11,801), Self-teaching corners + Classrooms (66,530), Entertainment area (12,724)
- Total area (Second campus included)(m^{2}): 393,008
- Number of classrooms: 256; Classrooms' area (m^{2}): 24,979
- Number of laboratories: 316; Laboratories' area (m^{2}): 30,266
- Number of workshops: 26; Workshops' area (m^{2}): 5,631

(According to information sources up to April 2024)

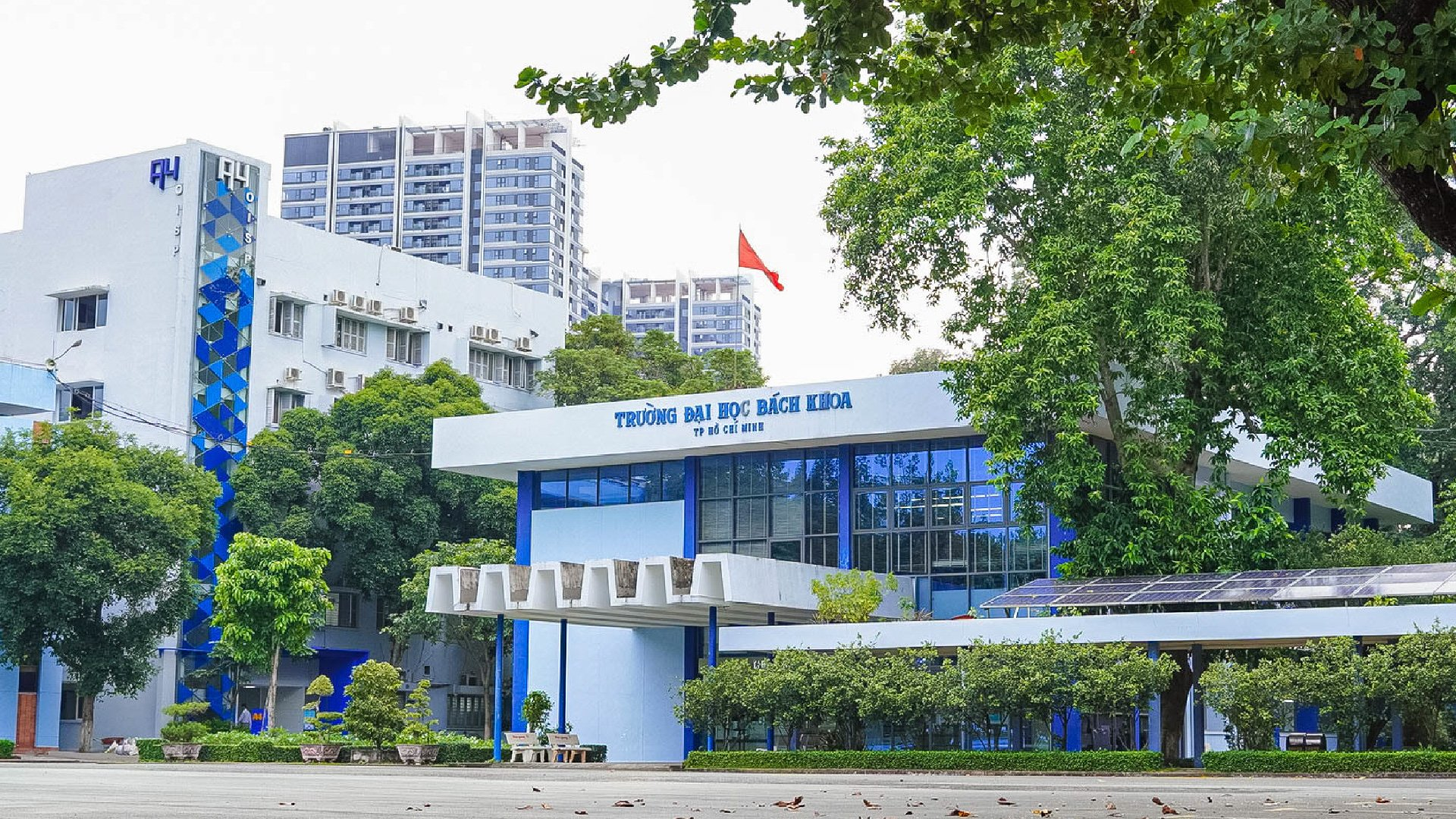
Library in the main campus

=== Faculties & Centers & Student affairs ===
- Faculty of Mechanical Engineering
- Faculty of Material Technology
- Faculty of Electrical and Electronics Engineering
- Faculty of Applied Science
- Faculty of Computer Science and Engineering
- Faculty of Geology and Petroleum Engineering
- Faculty of Transportation Engineering
- Faculty of Chemical Engineering
- Faculty of Civil Engineering
- Faculty of Environment and Natural Resources
- Faculty of Industrial Management
- Office of International Study Programs
- Human Resource Development and Training Center
- Industrial Maintenance Training Center
- Foreign Language Center

=== Affiliated center(s) ===
- Center for Developing Information Technology and Geographic Information Systems (DITAGIS)
- Research & Application center of technology for construction (REACTEC)
- Asian Centre for Water Research
- Polymer Research Center
- Refinery and Petrochemicals Technology Research Center (RPTC)
- Bach khoa Research Center for Manufacturing Engineering (BK-RECME)
- Center of Computer Engineering
- Business Research and Training Center (BR&T)
- Data and Information Technology Center
- Bach khoa Dormitory Service Center
- Student Services Center
- Technology Business Incubation Center

=== Affiliated compan(y/ies) ===
- Bach khoa High tech JSC HCMC

== Achievements ==
HCMUT received a First-class Labor Medal (1998), a Third-class Independence Medal (2002), a title of Labor Hero of the Reformation Period (2005), a Second-class Independence Medal (2007), a First Class Independence Medal (2012) along with many certificates of merit from the prime minister as well as heads from different ministries, departments, and organizations.

The university has won many domestic and international awards. In the last 10 years, 208 STEM Olympic prizes have been attained. It consists of 31 first prizes, 29 second prizes, and 72 third prizes. Students of HCMUT have won the Asia-Pacific Robocon championship three times in 2002 (Japan, Robocon's first year), 2004 (Korea) and 2006 (Malaysia).

In 2014, the university met ABET accreditation standards in two degree programs: Computer Science and Computer Engineering. Becoming the first university in Vietnam to meet ABET accreditation standards.

In 2017, the university met AUN-QA standards by the Southeast Asian Universities Network (AUN). AUN-QA's set of university-level assessment frameworks was built by leading experts in ASEAN with 25 standards, and 111 criteria, covering all aspects of a university such as strategic management, systems, functions, and performance results. This set of standards is compatible with US and European standards. This is the first member university of Vietnam National University, Ho Chi Minh City, the second university in the country to be externally evaluated according to AUN-QA standards, and the fourth university to be evaluated in the Southeast region (ASIAN).

In addition, HCMUT has the largest number of programs meeting international accreditation standards nationwide. 66 programs met international standards such as HCERES, ABET, CTI, ASIIN, AQAS, FIBAA, AUN-QA, etc. (updated until July 220224)

HCMUT aims to become the first university in Vietnam with all training programs accredited by global organizations. The university even guides students to the global job market.

== Presidents ==
- 1975-1976 Prof. Dr. Đang Huu
- 1977-1982 Prof. Dr. Tran Hong Quan
- 1982-1989 Assoc. Prof. Dr. Huynh Van Hoang
- 1989-1998 Prof. Dr. Truong Minh Ve
- 1998-2002 Prof. Dr. Phan Thi Tuoi
- 2002-2007 Prof. Dr. Phan Thi Tuoi
- 2007-2012 Prof. Dr. Vu Dinh Thanh
- 2012-2017 Prof. Dr. Vu Dinh Thanh
- 2018-2023 Assoc. Prof. Dr. Mai Thanh Phong
- 2023-2028 Assoc. Prof. Dr. Mai Thanh Phong

== Notable alumni ==
State leaders

- Tran Luu Quang – Chairman of the Central Economic Commission, former deputy prime minister of the Socialist Republic of Vietnam
- Truong Hoa Binh – former permanent Deputy Prime Minister of the Government of the Socialist Republic of Vietnam
- Prof. Phan Thanh Binh – former Director of the National University, former chairman of the National Assembly Committee for Culture, Education, Youth, Adolescents and Children.
- Phan Van Sau – former inspector general of the Government of Vietnam, former secretary of the Provincial Party Committee of Soc Trang province.
- Pham Duc Long – Deputy Minister of information and communications

Provincial, city leaders

- Nguyen Ho Hai – deputy secretary of Ho Chi Minh Party Committee
- Nguyen Thi Thu Ha – former Vice Chairman of Ho Chi Minh City People's Committee
- Vo Van Minh – chairman of the People's Committee of Binh Duong
- Huynh Quoc Viet – Chairman of the People's Committee of Ca Mau
- Pham Van Tan – former Chairman of the People's Committee of Tay Ninh
- Dang Minh Thong – vice Chairman of Ba Ria – Vung Tau Provincial People's Committee
- Nguyen Minh Lam – vice Chairman of Long An Provincial People's Committee
- Nguyen Phuoc Thien – vice Chairman of Dong Thap Provincial People's Committee
- Tran Tri Quang – vice Chairman of Dong Thap Provincial People's Committee
- Nguyen Thanh Nhan – vice Chairman of Kien Giang Provincial People's Committee

World-renowned scientist

- Prof. Duong Quang Trung – professor at Memorial University in Newfoundland, Canada and visiting lecturer at Queen's University Belfast, UK.

Leaders of large companies

- Huynh Quang Liem – General Director of VNPT Group
- Lam Du Son – former Deputy General Director, member of the board of directors of Vietnam Electricity Group
- Tran Ba Duong – Chairman of the board of directors of Truong Hai Group Joint Stock Company (THACO)
- Ho Minh Tri – Chairman of the board of directors of Phat Tien Trading Investment Company
- Huynh Huu Bang - Country Sales Director of DUHAL

== See also ==
- List of universities in Vietnam
- Vietnam National University, Ho Chi Minh City
