= Bàn Cờ Market =

Market in Ho Chi Minh City, Vietnam

Bàn Cờ Market (Vietnamese: Chợ Bàn Cờ) is a market in District 3, Ho Chi Minh City selling a variety of produce, meat, and prepared foods. The market is located off Bàn Cờ Street between Nguyễn Đình Chiểu and Điện Biên Phủ, near the Nguyen Thien Thuat apartment buildings.

Bàn Cờ Market comprises one main laneway and several branching off, its name "Bàn Cờ" reflects the market and the nearby residental area street hiearchy resemblance to a chessboard in layout. The market is popular for its Vietnamese street food, including bánh xèo, bột chiên, and bánh khọt.
