= Tân Hòa, Ho Chi Minh City =

Tân Hòa Phường Tân Hòa Tân Phước
- Ward
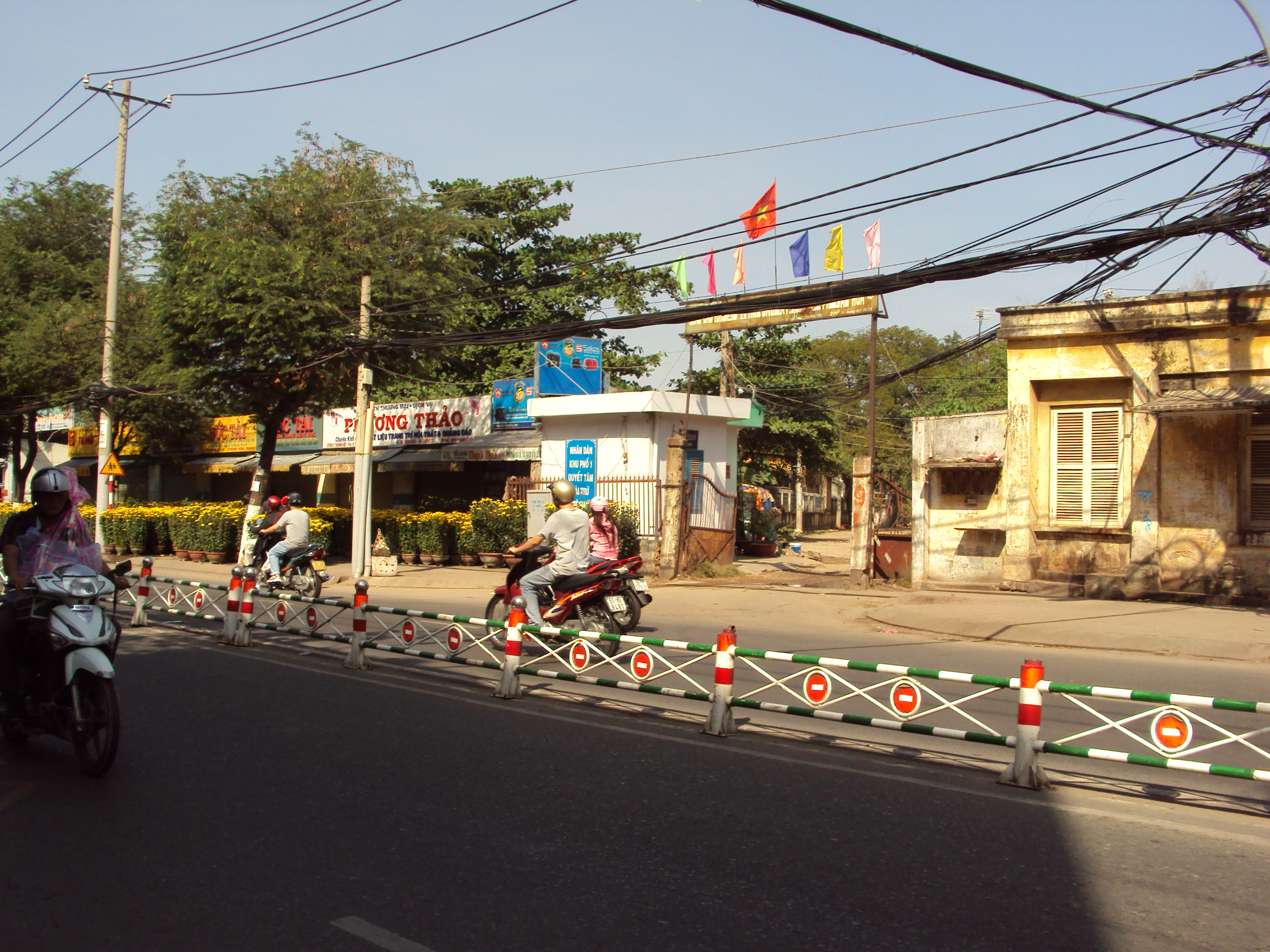
- A road in Tân Hòa
- Interactive map of Tân Hòa
- Coordinates: 10°46′50″N 106°39′19″E
- Country: Vietnam
- Municipality: Ho Chi Minh City
- Established: June 16, 2025

Area
  - Total: 0.57 sq mi (1.47 km^{2})

Population (2024)
  - Total: 93,437
  - Density: 165,000/sq mi (63,600/km^{2})
- Time zone: UTC+07:00 (Indochina Time)
- Administrative code: 26995

Tân Hòa (Vietnamese: Phường Tân Hòa) is a ward of Ho Chi Minh City, Vietnam. It is one of the 168 new wards, communes and special zones of the city following the reorganization in 2025.

== History ==
On June 16, 2025, the National Assembly Standing Committee issued Resolution No. 1685/NQ-UBTVQH15 on the arrangement of commune-level administrative units of Ho Chi Minh City in 2025 (effective from June 16, 2025). Accordingly, the entire land area and population of Ward 6, Ward 8 and Ward 9 of the former Tân Bình district will be integrated into a new ward named Tân Hòa (Clause 58, Article 1).

== Administration ==
The ward is divided into 36 neighborhoods, numbered from 1 to 36.
