= Chợ Lớn =

Quarter of Ho Chi Minh City, Vietnam, known as Chinatown

Coordinates: 10°44′56″N 106°39′00″E

Cholon Chợ Lớn (Vietnamese) 堤岸 (Chinese) Saigon (Note: Before the Cochinchina campaign), Đê Ngạn
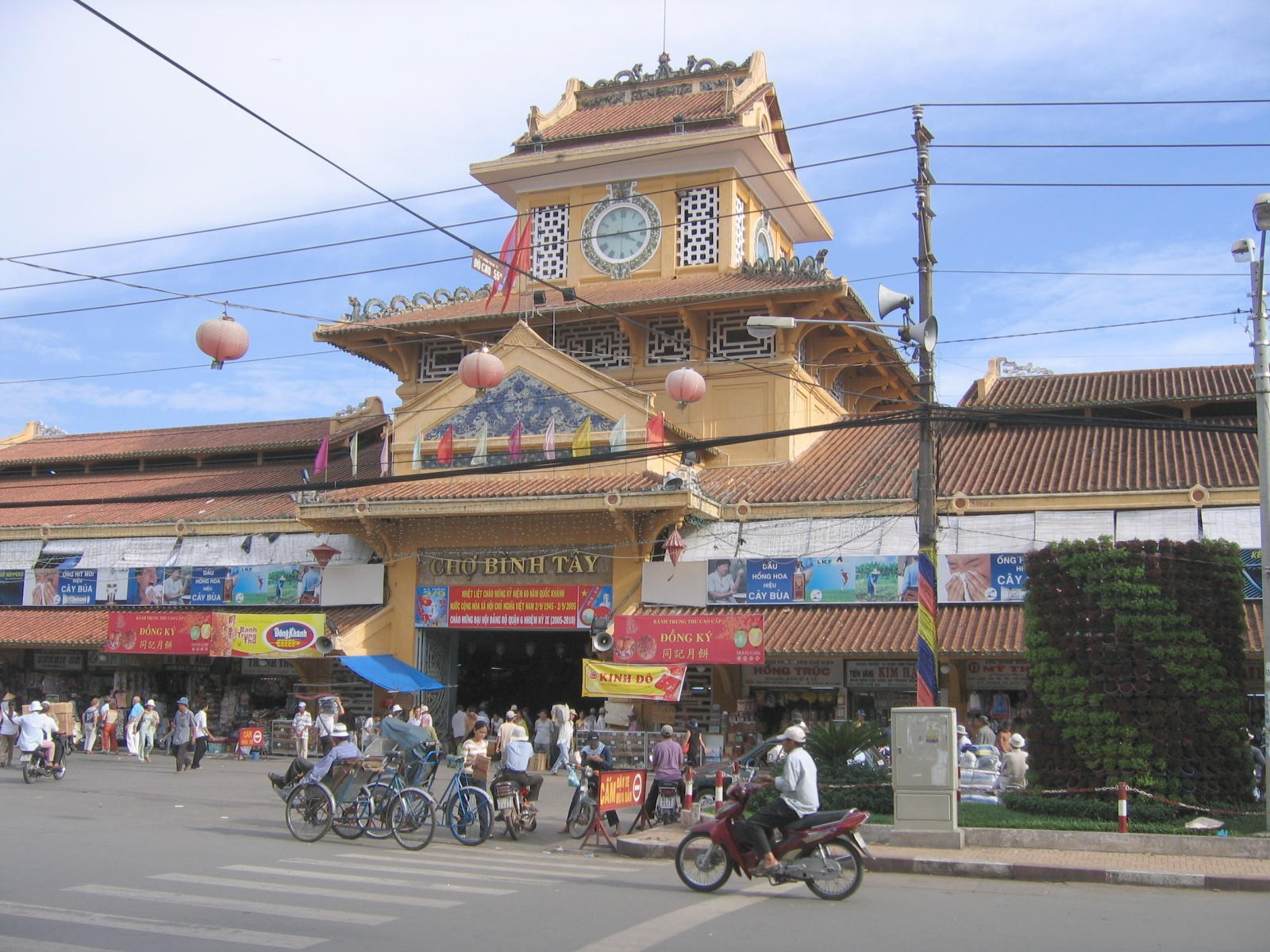
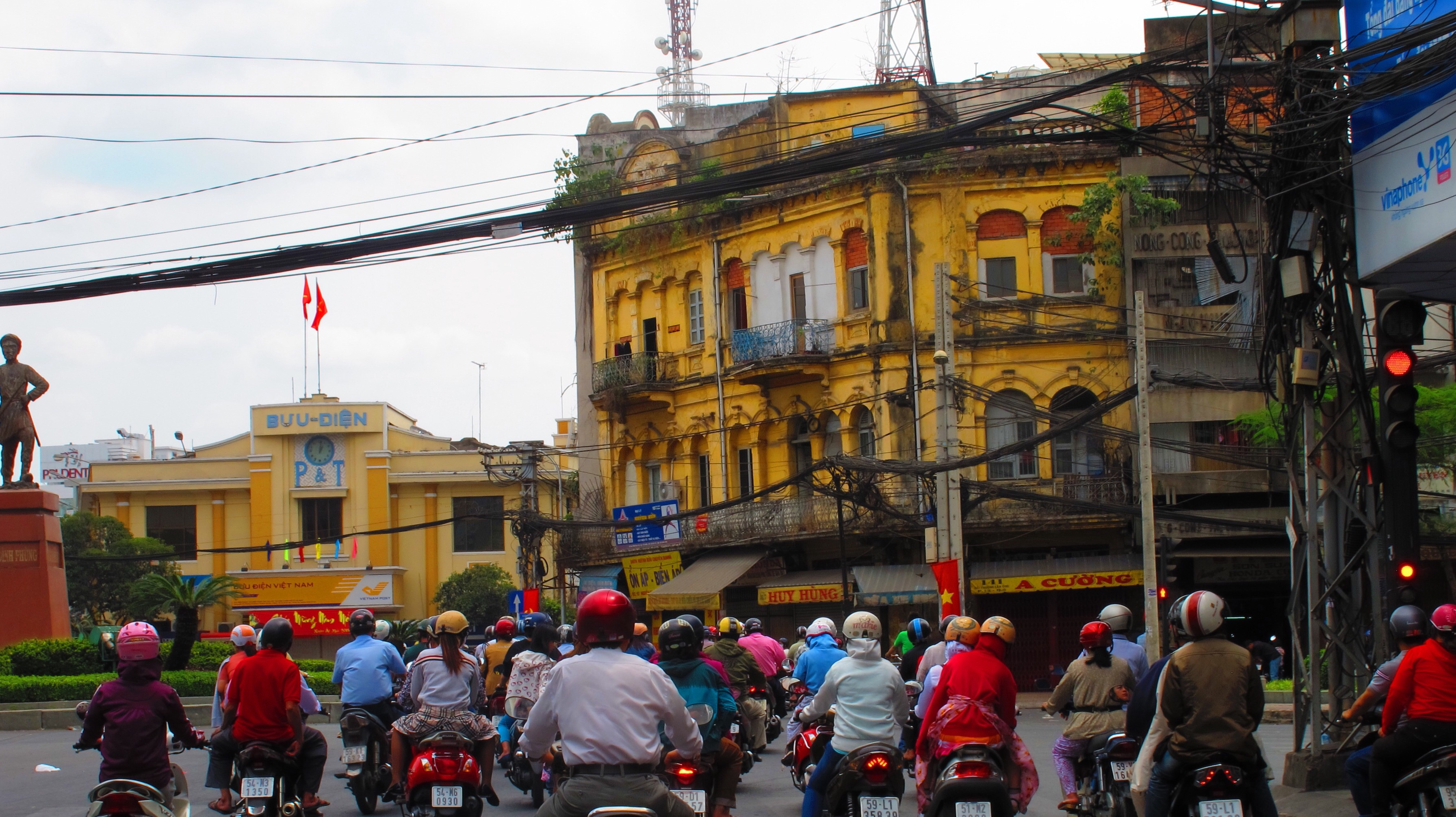
- Bình Tây Market - the largest market in Chợ Lớn Châu Văn Liêm St, with the Chợ Lớn Central Post Office in the background
- Interactive map of Cholon
- Country: Vietnam
- Municipality: Ho Chi Minh City
- Districts (former): District 5, District 6

Chợ Lớn
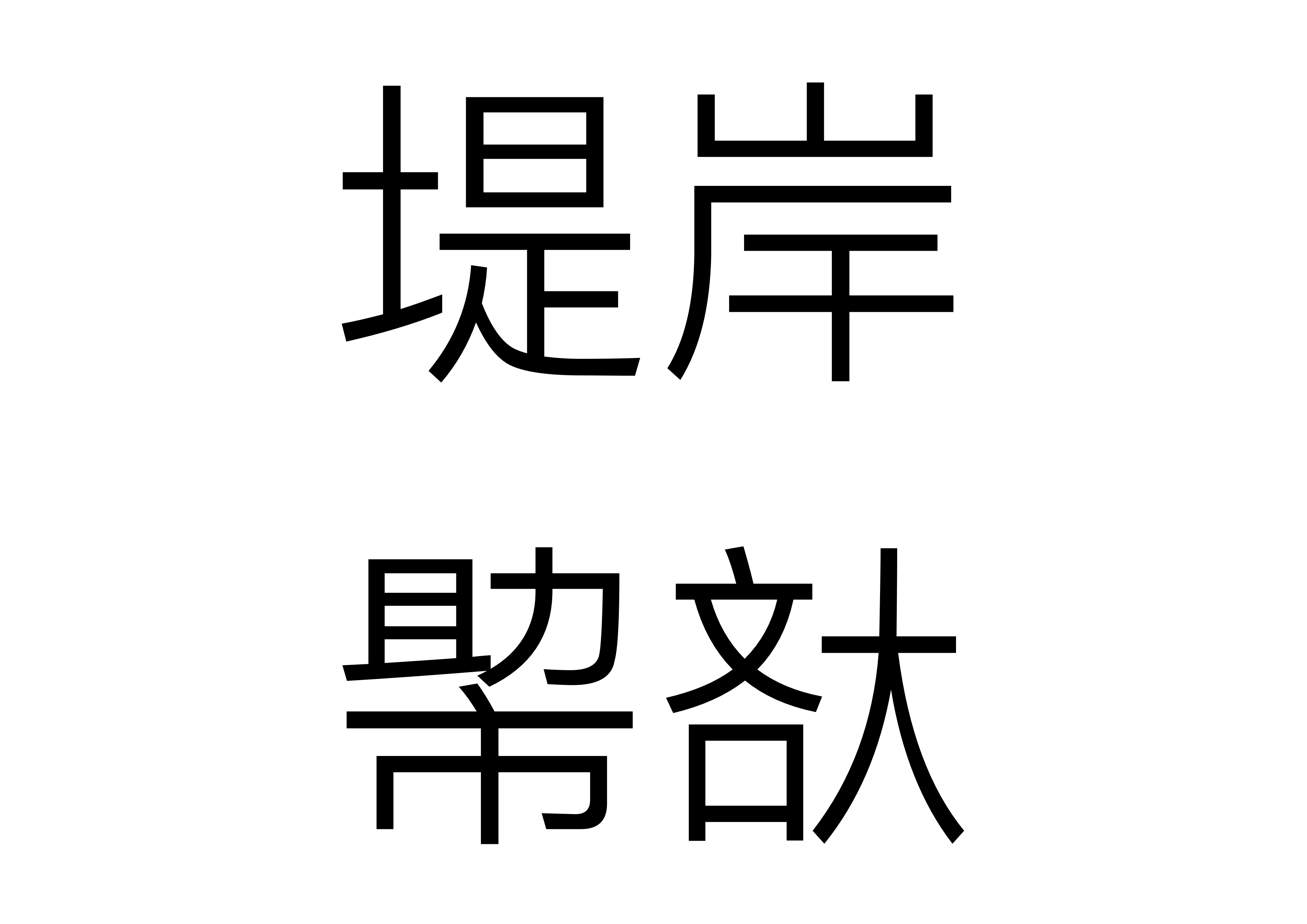
- "Đê Ngạn" and "Chợ Lớn" as written in dialects of Chinese (top) and Vietnamese (bottom). Note that the script used for the below name is no longer used to write the Vietnamese language.

Chinese name
- Chinese: 堤岸
- Hanyu Pinyin: Dī'àn
- Literal meaning: embankment
Transcriptions
Standard Mandarin
- Hanyu Pinyin: Dī'àn
- Wade–Giles: Ti^{1}an^{4}
- IPA: [tíˈân]
Hakka
- Romanization: Tiˇ ngan
Yue: Cantonese
- Yale Romanization: Tàihngohn
- Jyutping: tai^{4}ngon^{6}

Vietnamese name
- Vietnamese alphabet: Chợ Lớn
- Hán-Nôm: 𢄂𡘯

Chợ Lớn (Chinese: 堤岸 (Note: Sino-Vietnamese reading: Đê Ngạn Pinyin reading: Dī'àn Jyutping reading: tai^{4} ngon^{6} Vietnamese reading of the Cantonese pronunciation: Thầy Ngòn)), usually anglicized as "Cholon" in English sources, is an unofficial quarter of Ho Chi Minh City, Vietnam. Historically a city separate from Sài Gòn prior to its urbanization in the 1930s-1950s, the quarter has long been inhabited by Chinese people and is considered the largest Chinatown in the world by area.

Chợ Lớn lies on the west bank of the Saigon River, and spans across all of former District 5 and District 6. (Note: After the 2025 Vietnamese administrative reforms, this consists of the wards: Chợ Lớn, Chợ Quán, An Đông, Bình Phú, Phú Lâm, Bình Tiên, and Bình Tây.) The quarter borders the former District 8 (along the Tàu Hủ Canal) to the south, and the former Districts 10 & 11 to the north.

== Etymology ==
Professor Chen Zhenghong, when researching textual criticism at China's Fudan University, wrote: "As known before, the term "Đê Ngạn" (堤岸; Pinyin: Dī'àn) literally means 'embankment', more specifically (originating from) the 'Sài Gòn embankment', a place which has — for a long period of time — been settled by the Chinese diaspora".

However, Vietnamese etymologist An Chi rejects this, and described the explanation as "absurd" as Sài Gòn apparently "did not harbor any embankments". He further argued that the term had originally been written by Chinese settlers as: "提岸", (Note: Its Sino-Vietnamese reading being: "Đề Ngạn", instead) with the character "提" (consisting of the 'hand' radical) being replaced with the character "堤" (consisting of the 'earth' radical) later on to align with its alleged definition of 'embankment'. Both terms are pronounced in Cantonese as tai^{4} ngon^{6} (transliterated into Vietnamese as "Thầy Ngòn" or Thì Ngòn) and are phonetic transcriptions of the Vietnamese term: "Sài Gòn".

On the other hand, the Vietnamese name Chợ Lớn (lit. 'big market') is exclusively used among the majority of Vietnamese speakers. The name originated from two markets in the area, whose stark difference in size resulted in the larger & newer market being referred to as "Chợ Lớn" to differentiate it from its smaller, older counterpart. The name eventually grew to refer to the rest of the quarter.

An Chi also stated that, prior to the official creation of "Sài Gòn" (its area at establishment composing of the former District 1 and District 3 (Note: After the 2025 Vietnamese administrative reforms, this consists of the wards: Tân Định, Sài Gòn, Bến Thành, Cầu Ông Lãnh, Bàn Cờ, Xuân Hòa,, and Nhiêu Lộc.)) by the French, that Sài Gòn originally referred to the areas of modern-day Chợ Lớn – before referring to Bến Nghé as well.

== History ==
=== Feudal era ===
The city of Chợ Lớn was de facto established by the Hoa community. The Lê dynasty which was the ruling family in the sixteenth century began to decline in power and two rival families, the Trịnh and Nguyễn families began to vie for power to fill in the void of the Lê. The Nguyễn lords were then appointed as Viceroy of the South with headquarters at Huế where they encouraged Chinese immigration to settle down into the area.

Prior to 1698, there had already been a Minh Hương village in what was modern-day Chợ Lớn – then referred to as Đề Ngạn. Originally consisting of Chinese refugees in the South who had gone against the Qing dynasty, a massive wave of Chinese immigrants arriving from Cù lao Phố (an island located in modern-day Trấn Biên ward, part of the former city of Biên Hòa) would flock to the village following the destruction of their homes by the Tây Sơn forces for sheltering Gia Long during their pursuit of him — as well as following the aftermath of a series of conflicts between the Hòa Nghĩa and Đông Sơn armies. In 1782, more than 10,000 Hoa people were once again massacred by the Tây Sơn and had to rebuild.

Due to demand, Chinese settlers would eventually build a market (as well as expand existing ones) along the historic Sài Gòn Canal (Note: Not to be confused with the modern-day Saigon River) (modern-day Hải Thượng Lãn Ông Street) to exchange goods and services.

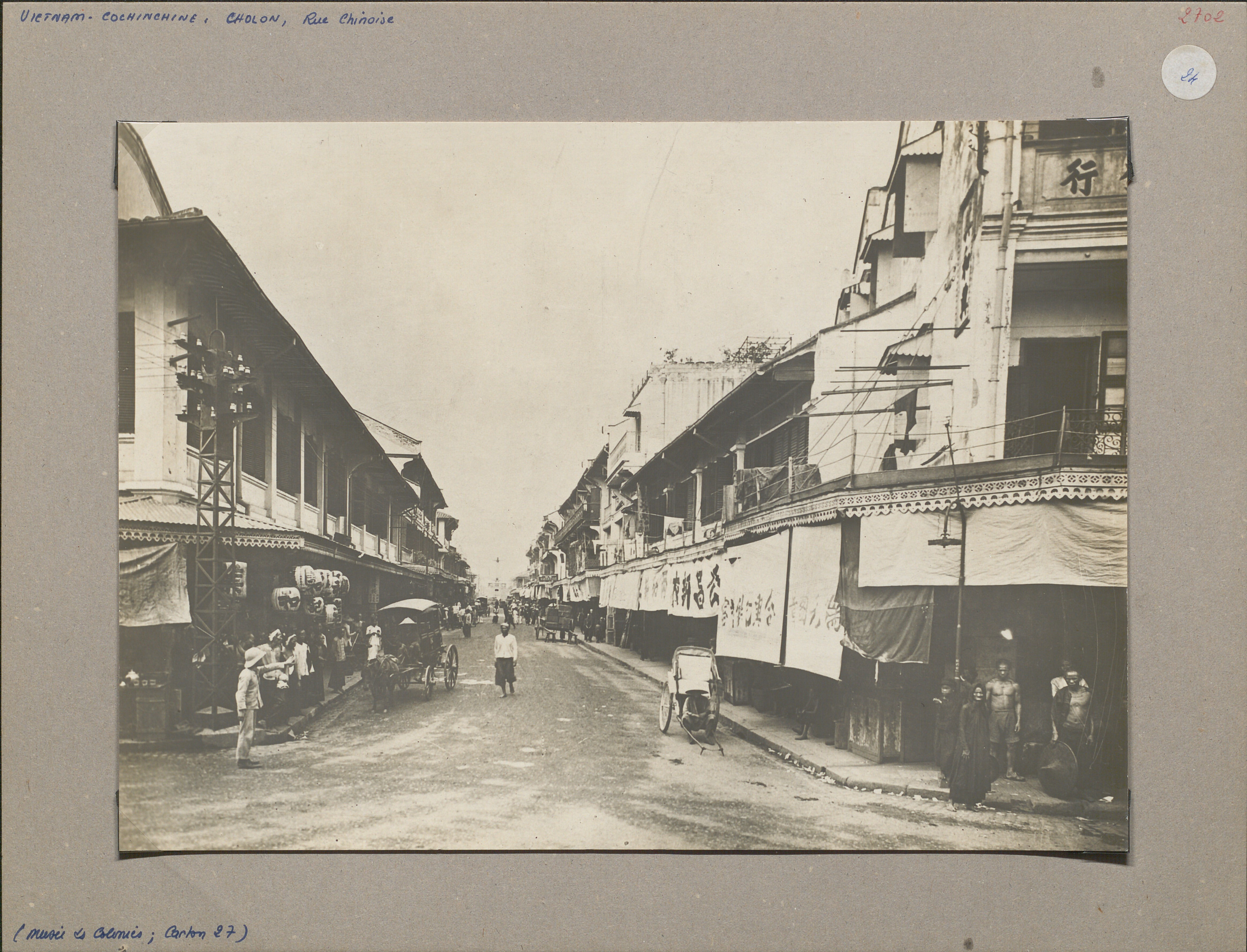
Gia Long Street, taken in the early 20th century (modern-day Trịnh Hoài Đức Street, Chợ Lớn ward)

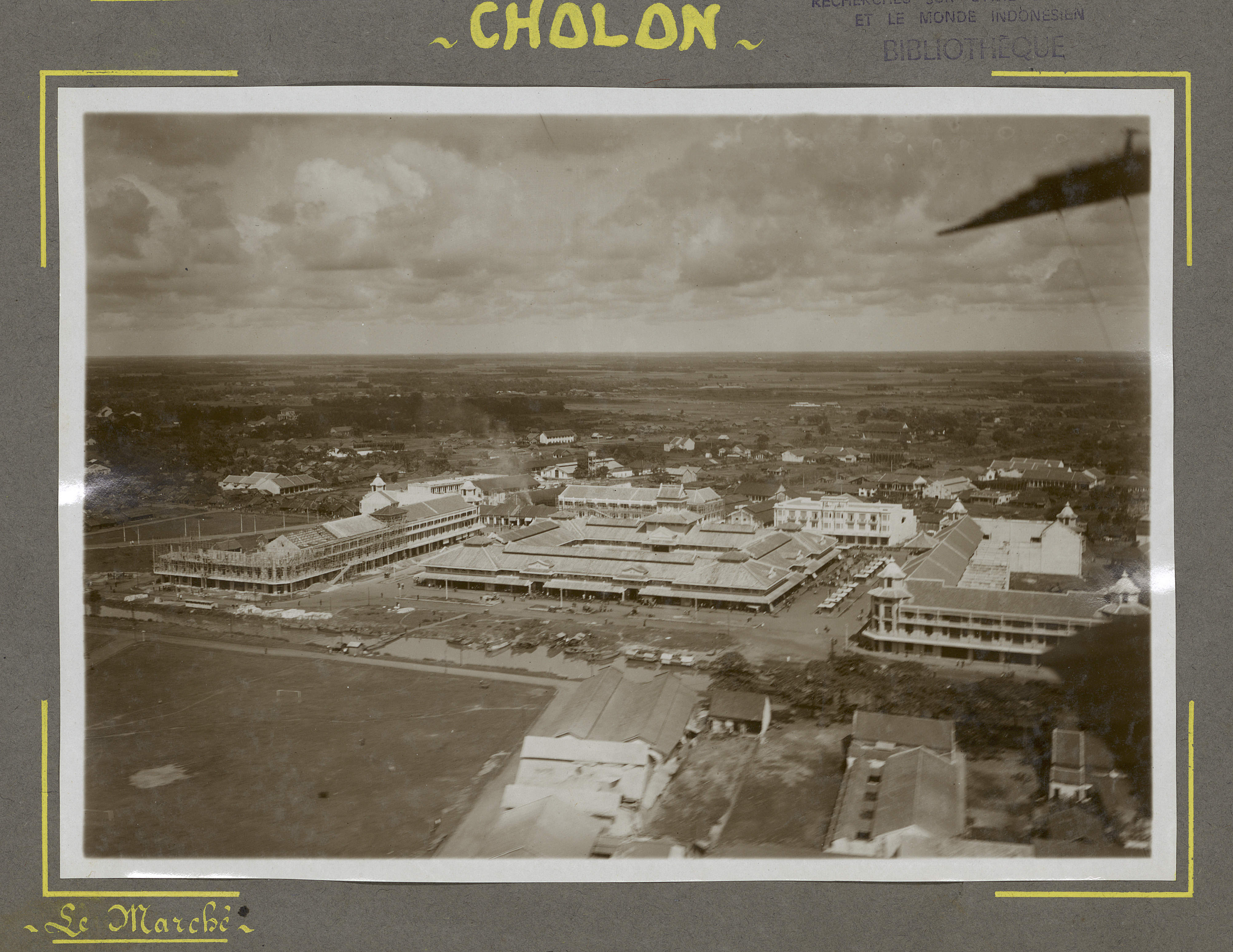
Aerial photograph of the back side of Bình Tây Market, circa 1930

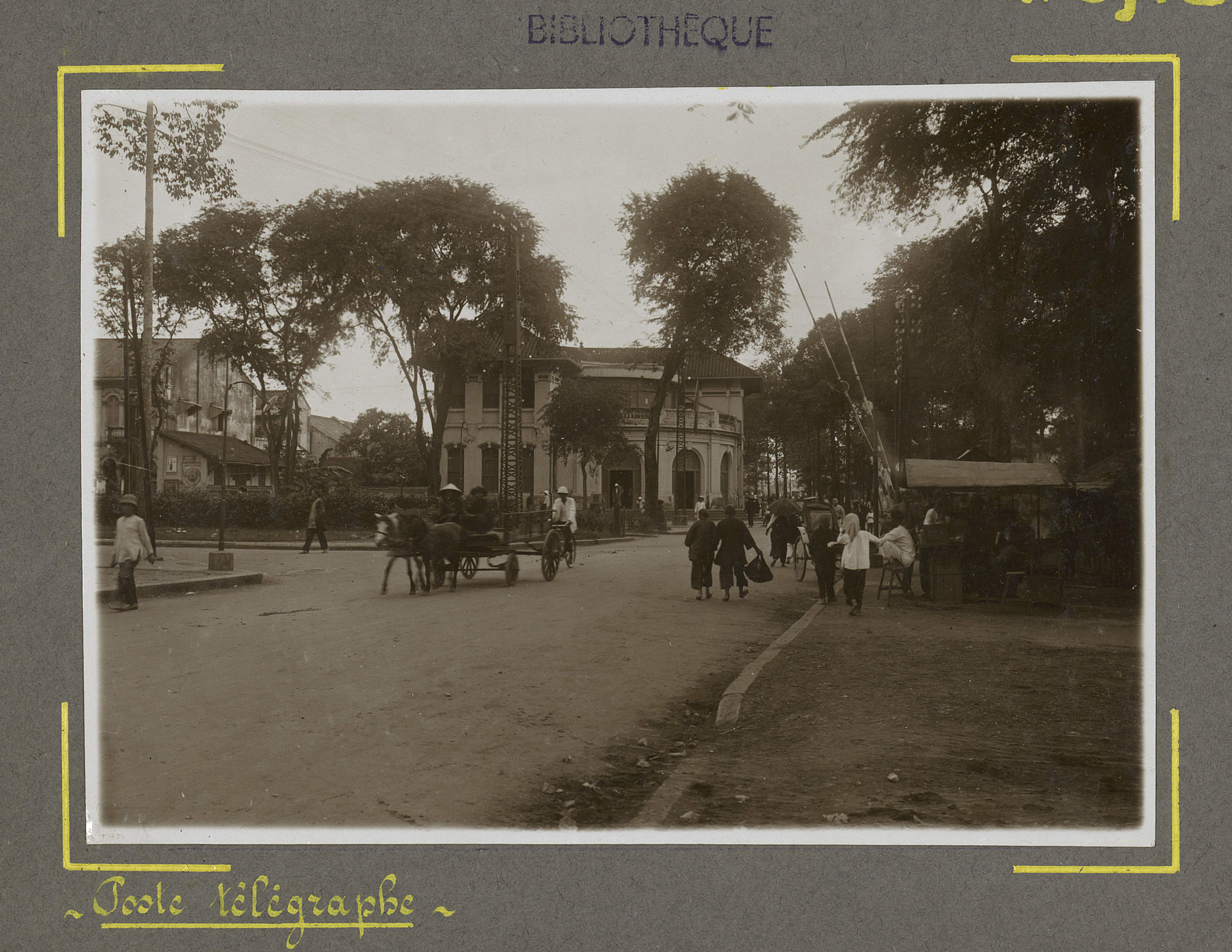
(c. 1930) Chợ Lớn Post Office, now located at the intersection between Hồng Bàng and Châu Văn Liêm St.

=== Under French rule ===
The "City of Chợ Lớn" (Ville de Cholon) was officially established on the 6th of June, 1865, according to a decree ratified by Pierre-Paul de La Grandière (then interim Governor of Cochinchina), on the territories of a number of villages situated in 3 cantons: Tân Phong Thượng, Tân Phong Trung, and Tân Phong Hạ. By 1879, the city was recognized as a "2nd-class municipality" (Note: Equivalent to provinces.) (municipalité de 2e classe) by Governor Charles Le Myre de Vilers, alongside cities in other parts of French Indochina such as Tourane and Phnom Penh. The City of Chợ Lớn was then considered separate from Chợ Lớn province — despite housing the latter's headquarters of government — and was instead led by a mayor (Thị trưởng / maire). (Note: Who was nominated by the Governor and appointed by the Governor-General)

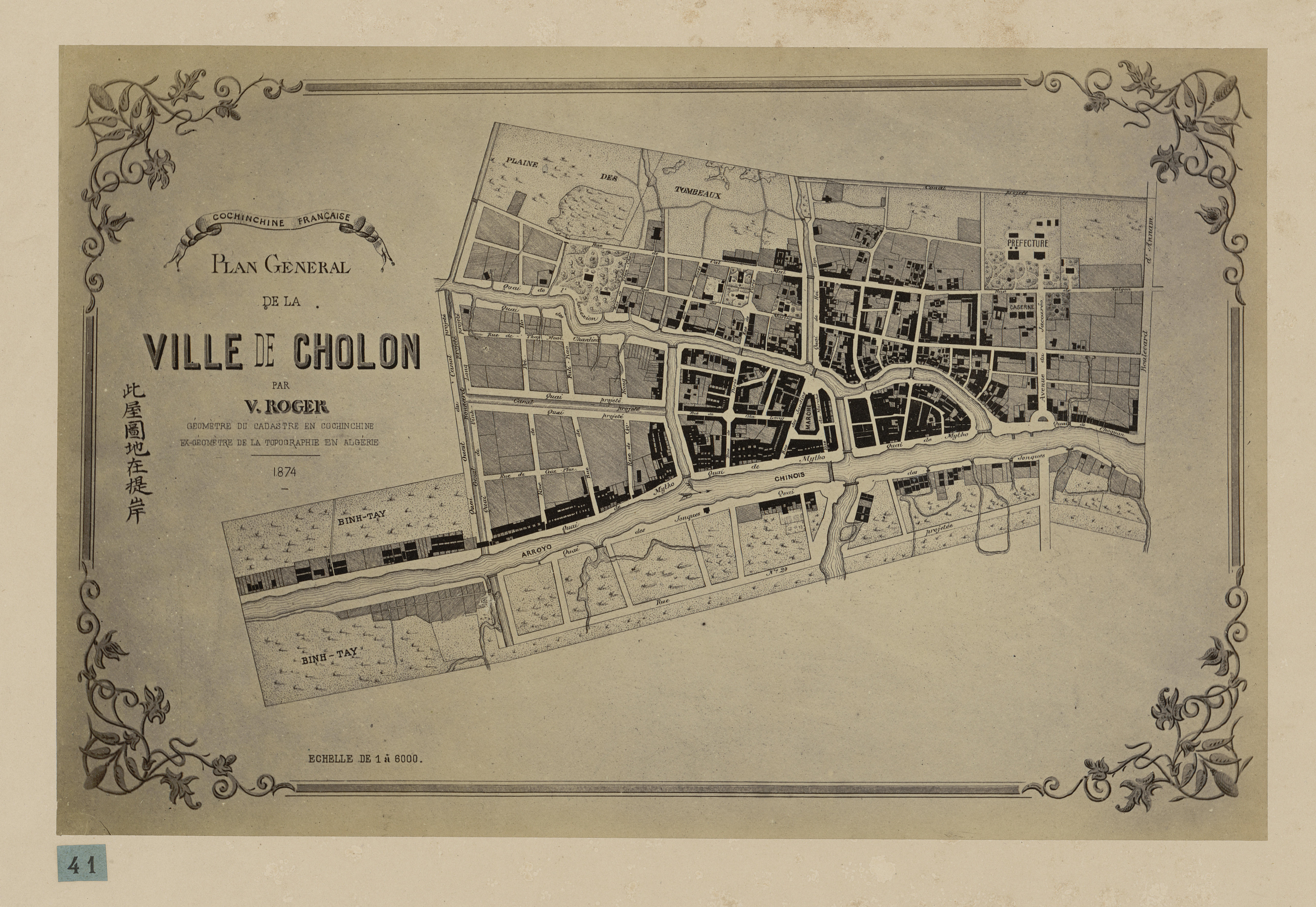
Map of the city of Chợ Lớn in 1874

In 1882, a meter-wide, 5 kilometer long tramway connecting the cities of Sài Gòn and Chợ Lớn began operations on the 1st of July. By 1930, the two cities had shared a border along what is now "Nguyễn Văn Cừ" and "Nguyễn Thiên Thuật" Street.

French censuses stated at the time that, in 1901, Chợ Lớn had a population of approximately 63,237. By February 1920, that number had risen to 93,949.

On the 27th of April, 1931, Chợ Lớn and the neighboring city of Saigon were merged to form a single administrative division called the Saigon–Cholon Area (Khu Sài Gòn – Chợ Lớn). The official name, however, never entered everyday vernacular speech and the city continued to be referred to as Saigon.

The Saigon–Cholon Area was headed by a 'Chief' (Khu trưởng), who was also appointed by the Governor-General and additionally served as "President of the Administrative Council of the Saigon-Cholon Region" (Chủ tịch Hội đồng quản lý khu Sài Gòn - Chợ Lớn). On the other hand, the aforementioned position of Mayor (Thị trưởng) would last until 1934, when several of its authorities were transferred to the position of Chief.

On the 30th of June, 1951, the Prime Minister of the State of Vietnam signed Decree No. 311-cab/SG, renaming the "Sài Gòn - Chợ Lớn Area" to the "Sài Gòn - Chợ Lớn Capital City" (Đô thành Sài Gòn-Chợ Lớn).

=== Under South Vietnamese rule ===
In 1956, "Chợ Lớn" was dropped from the city's official name entirely. During the Vietnam War, soldiers and deserters from the United States Army maintained a thriving black market in Chợ Lớn, trading in various American and especially U.S. Army-issue items. This was the area, near the Quan Âm Pagoda, where photojournalist Eddie Adams took his famous execution photograph. Four Australian journalists were also killed in Chợ Lớn during the Tet Offensive in 1968.

=== Present ===
On the 16th of June, 2025, the Standing Committee of the National Assembly enacted Resolution No. 1685/NQ-UBTVQH15 (as part of the 2025 Vietnamese administrative reforms), dissolving the former District 5 and merging wards 11, 12, 13, and 14 to form the newly-established Chợ Lớn ward, with a total area of 1,67 km² (0.64 sq mi). As a result, however, the officially-established ward only accounts for a fraction of the unofficial quarter's size.

== Culture and economy ==
As home to a significant number of the Chinese diaspora in Vietnam (the Hoa people), Chợ Lớn's culture is deeply influenced by that of Chinese immigrants (predominantly from areas such as Guangdong / Fujian), especially in areas such as cuisine, architecture, cultural festivals, traditions, medicine, etc.

As a result, Chợ Lớn has been described by many as, aside from a major economic & historic hub, a "melting pot of (mainly) Chinese and Vietnamese culture".

=== Notable cuisine / dishes ===
- Peking duck
- Steamed buns, more specifically multi-colored buns & Cả Cần steamed buns.
- har gow (蝦餃; há cảo)
- shuijiao (水餃; sủi cảo)
- wontons (雲吞; hoành thánh) (Note: Vietnamese terms for the 3 dishes above originate from the Cantonese reading of the name, as opposed to its Sino-Vietnamese reading. (In which case, the dishes would've been referred to as 'hà giáo', 'thủy giáo' and 'vân thôn', respectively.))
- "Lão Mã" salt-steamed chicken
- Satay venison hủ tiếu (rice noodle soup)
- Stir-fried Hokkien noodles (Note: Main ingredients may consist of beef, shrimp, seafood, etc. Also includes crispy-fried noodles, soft-fried noodles and braised duck egg noodles (mì vịt tiềm).)
- Stinky tofu
- Steamed chicken feet, often braised with fermented soybean paste.
- Buddha Jumps Over the Wall
- Varieties of chè: black sesame chè (chè mè đen), tea egg chè (chè trứng hồng trà), papaya chè (chè đu đủ tiềm), tangyuan, almond tofu, guilinggao, Hong Kong–style milk tea, etc.

=== Religious sites ===
Chợ Lớn is known to harbor various religious sites and places of worship, majority of which are of Chinese origin. Notably, a majority of the sites mentioned in the following lists are also located in the officially-established Chợ Lớn ward.

==== National relics ====
Name	Address	Notes
Minh Hương Gia Thạnh Communal House (明鄉嘉盛會館 (Note: In Sino-Vietnamese: Minh Hương Gia Thạnh Hội Quán) / Đình Minh Hương Gia Thạnh)	380 Trần Hưng Đạo, Chợ Lớn ward	
Hà Chương Assembly Hall (霞漳會館 / Hội quán Hà Chương)	802 Nguyễn Trãi, Chợ Lớn ward	
Lệ Châu Assembly Hall (麗朱會館 / Hội quán Lệ Châu)	586 Trần Hưng Đạo, Chợ Lớn ward	
Ôn Lăng Assembly Hall (溫陵會館 / Hội quán Ôn Lăng)	12 Lão Tử, Chợ Lớn ward	Also known as the Quan Âm Temple (Chùa Quân Âm)
Nghĩa An Assembly Hall (義安會館 / Hội quán Nghĩa An)	676 Nguyễn Trãi, Chợ Lớn ward	Also known as Tuệ Thành Assembly Hall (穗城會館 / Hội quán Tuệ Thành)
Nghĩa Nhuận Assembly Hall (義潤會館 / Hội quán Nghĩa Nhuận)	27 Phan Văn Khỏe, Chợ Lớn ward	Also known as Tuệ Thành Assembly Hall (穗城會館 / Hội quán Tuệ Thành)
Nhị Phủ Assembly Hall (二府會館 / Hội quán Nhị Phủ)	264 Hải Thượng Lãn Ông, Chợ Lớn ward	Also known as Tuệ Thành Assembly Hall (穗城會館 / Hội quán Tuệ Thành)
Quỳnh Phủ Assembly Hall (瓊府會館 / Hội quán Quỳnh Phủ)	276 Trần Hưng Đạo B, Chợ Lớn ward	Also known as Tuệ Thành Assembly Hall (穗城會館 / Hội quán Tuệ Thành)
Thien Hau Temple of Cholon (Miếu Thiên Hậu)	710 Nguyễn Trãi, Chợ Lớn ward	Also known as Tuệ Thành Assembly Hall (穗城會館 / Hội quán Tuệ Thành)

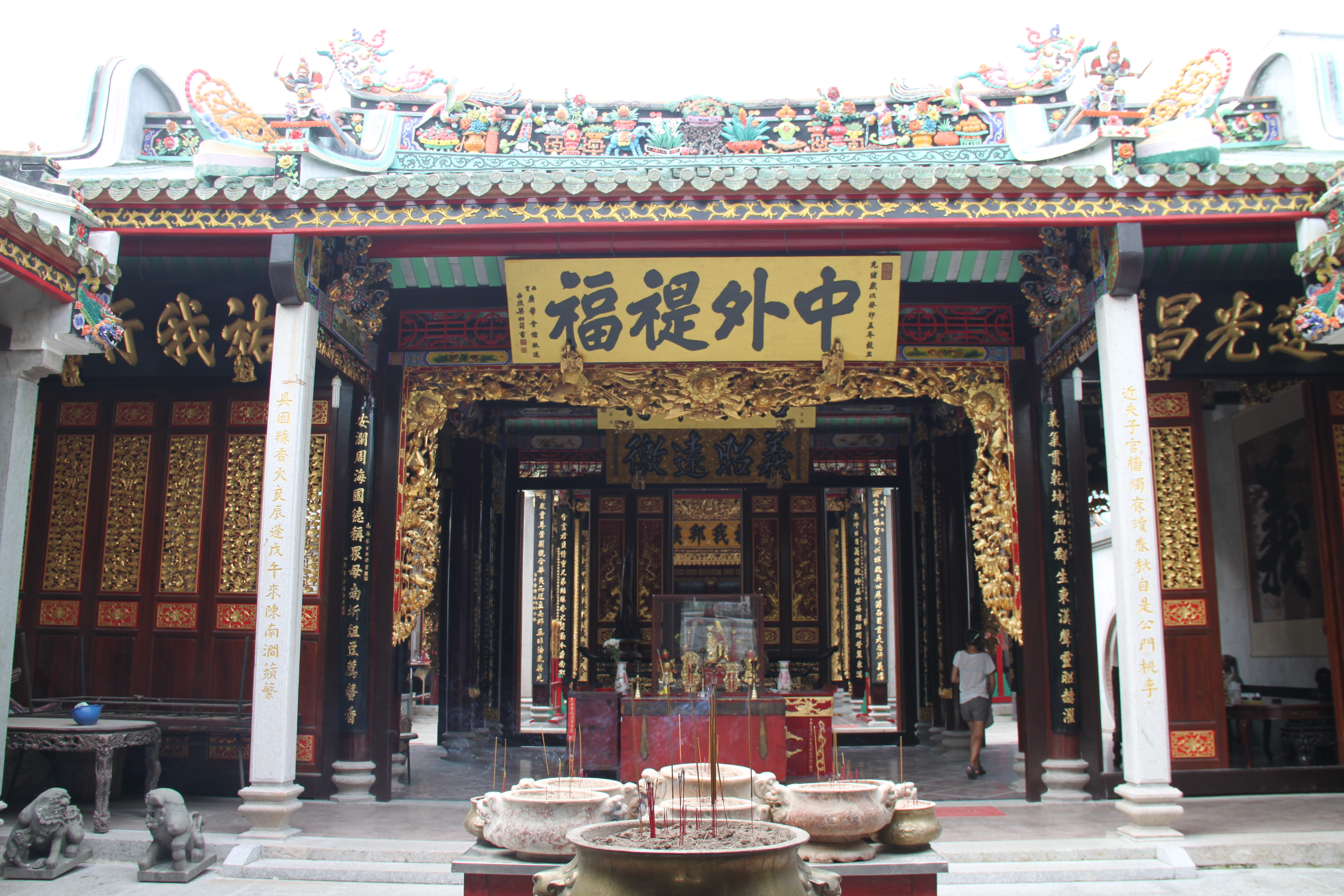
Nghĩa An Assembly Hall

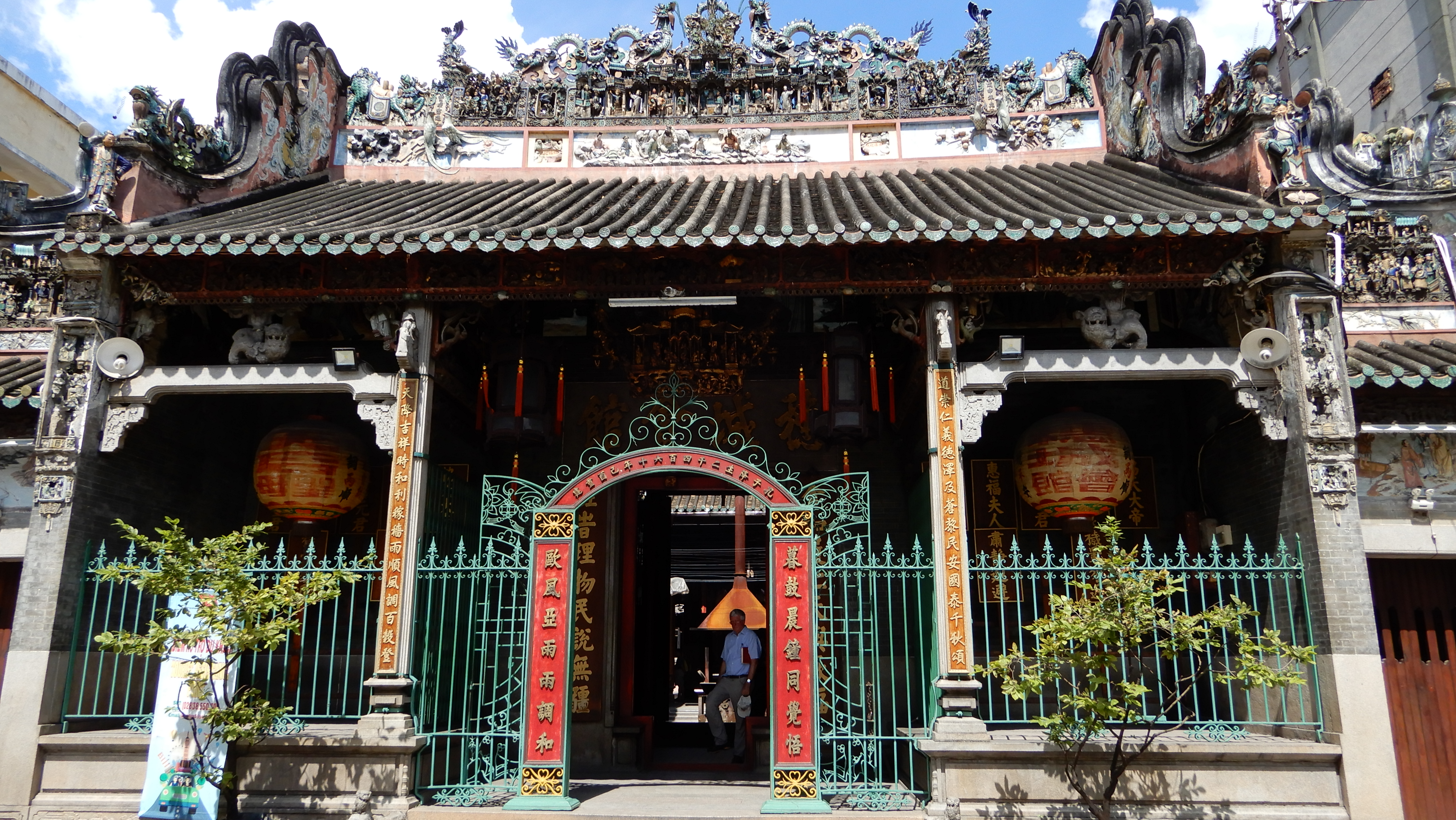
Thien Hau Temple of Cholon

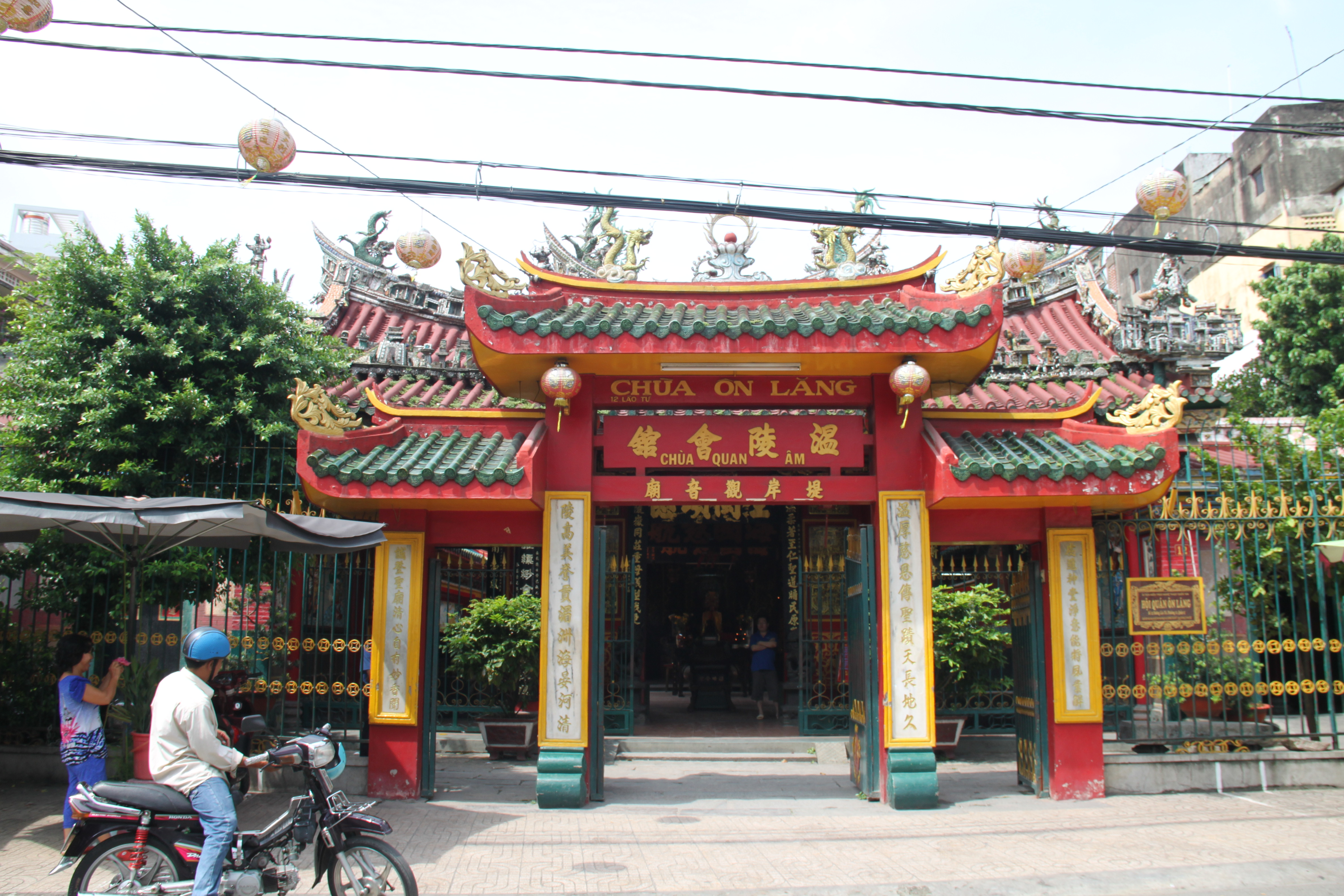
Ôn Lăng Assembly Hall

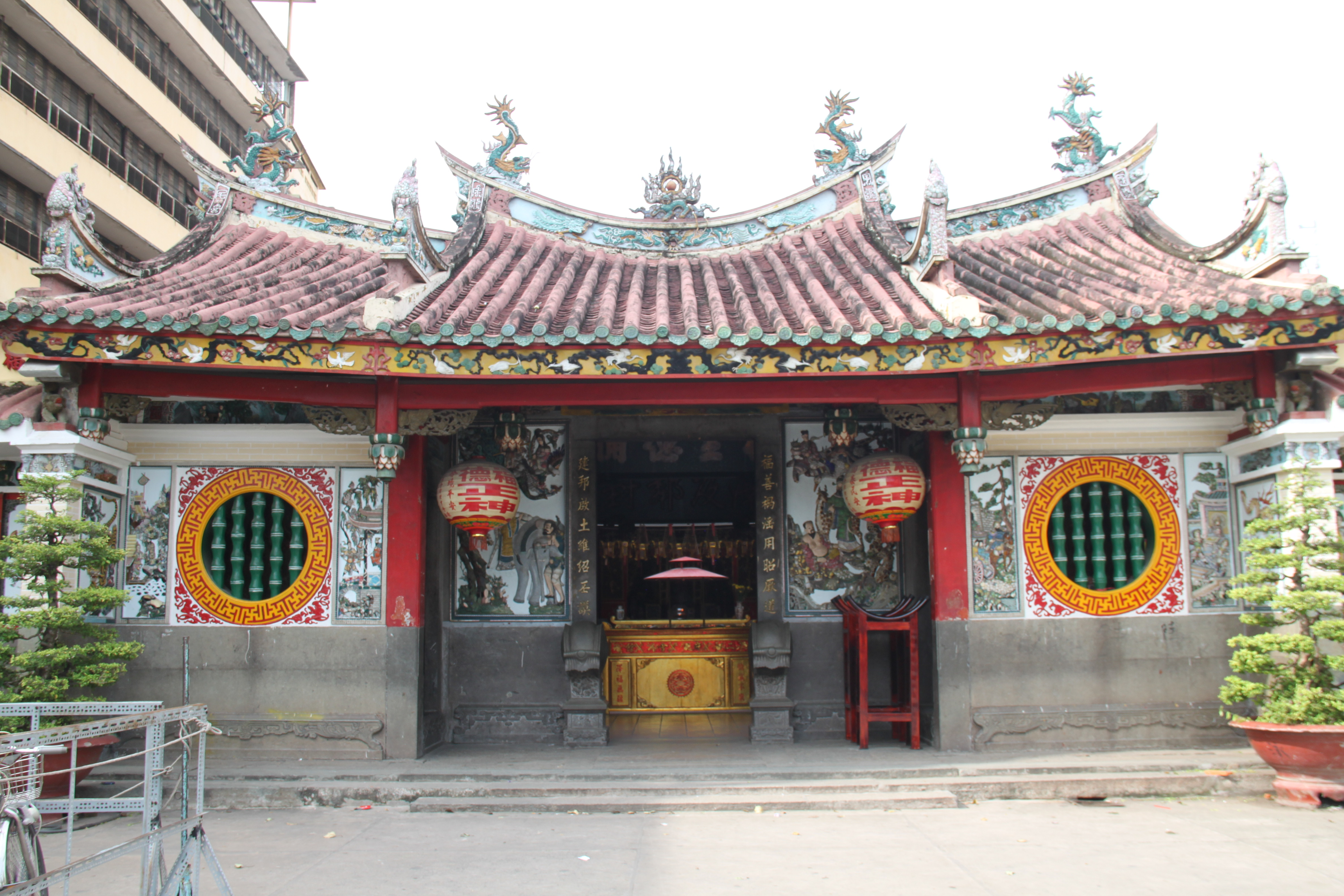
Nhị Phủ Assembly Hall

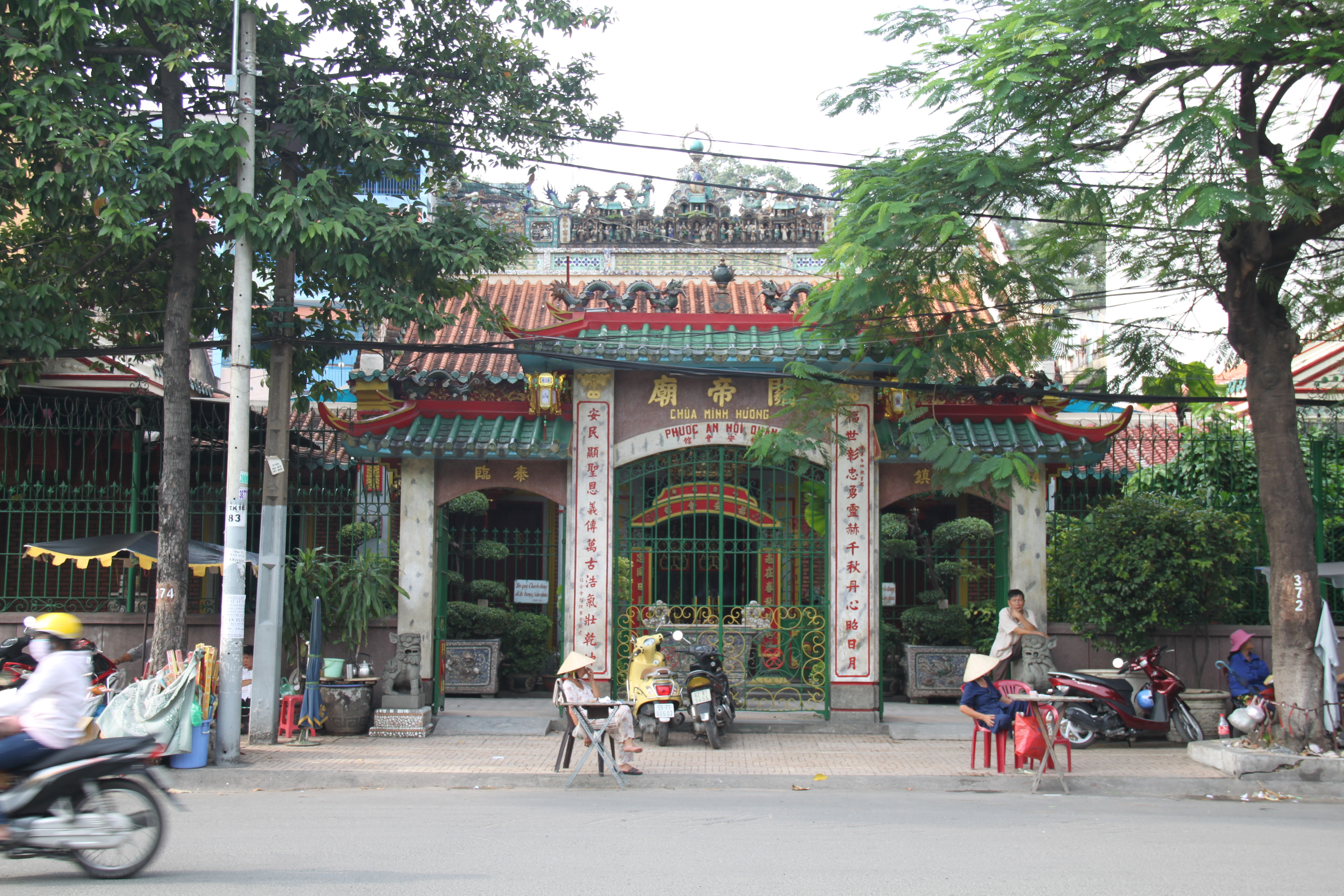
Phước An Assembly Hall

==== City-level relics ====
Name	Address	Notes
Thiên Tôn Pagoda (天尊寺 / Chùa Thiên Tôn)	117/3/2 An Bình, An Đông ward	
Tân Kiểng Pagoda (新景亭 / Đình Tân Kiểng)	718 Trần Hưng Đạo, Chợ Quán ward	
Phước An Assembly Hall (福安會館 / Hội quán Phước An)	184 Hồng Bàng, Chợ Lớn ward	Also known as "Minh Hương Pagoda"
Lý Family Ancestral House (李氏祠堂 / Từ đường họ Lý)	292 Hải Thượng Lãn Ông, Chợ Lớn ward	
Hokkien Ancestral House (福建祠堂 / Từ đường Phúc Kiến)	314 Nguyễn Trãi, An Đông ward	Located within Nguyễn Trãi Hospital

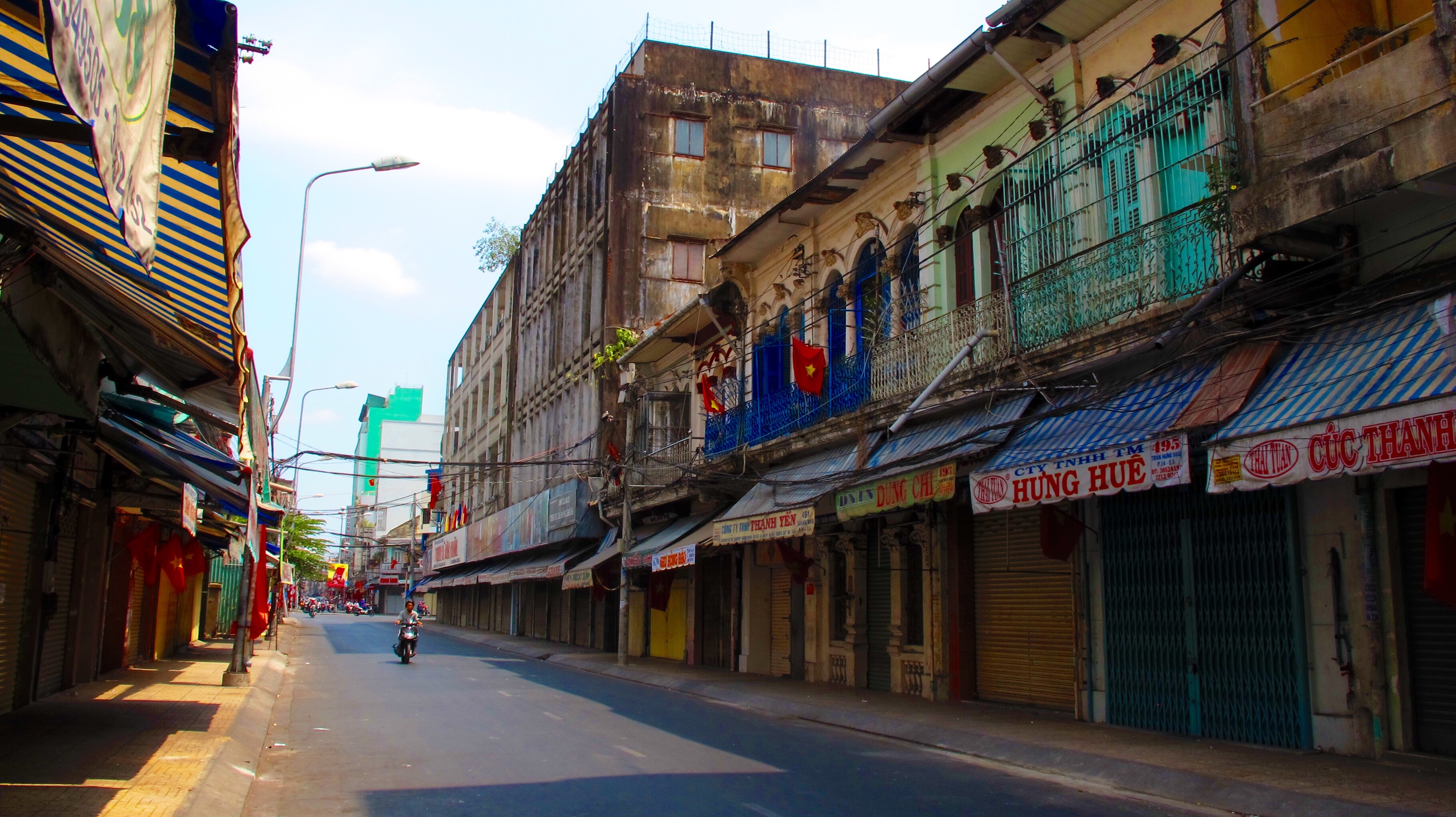
An array of shophouses in Chợ Lớn, known for having a distinct, antique style of architecture.

=== Commerce ===
Alongside the quarter's cultural significance, Chợ Lớn has long served as one of Ho Chi Minh City's commercial and trading hubs — evident through the diverse range of marketplaces, ranging from roadside shophouses to wholesale markets situated across Chợ Lớn.

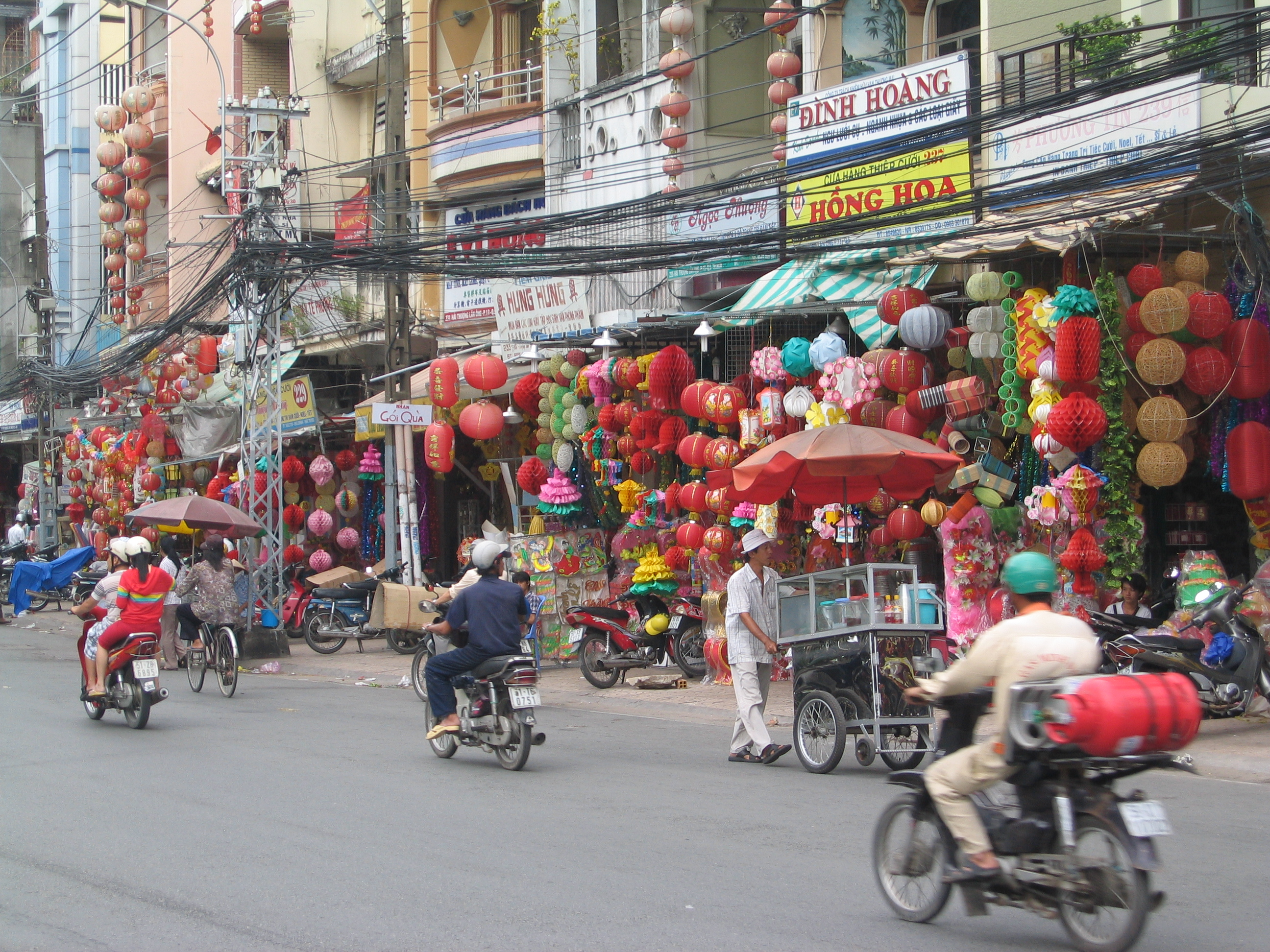
Hải Thượng Lãn Ông Old Street

==== Commercial streets/areas (tuyến phố chuyên doanh) ====
Commercial streets/areas (tuyến phố chuyên doanh) specializing in specific commodities, goods, and services (e.g. textiles, floristry, traditional Chinese medicine, gemstones, fashion, cuisine, etc.) can be found across the quarter, and are aimed at preserving local cultural traditions & heritage as well as boost local economic development via serving as tourist attractions.

Hải Thượng Lãn Ông Street (spanning across Chợ Lớn ward), and the historic canal which once stood in the area during feudal times, has long served as a major commercial and trading hub. Inhabited by the Chinese since the late 19th century, the area surrounding modern-day Hải Thượng Lãn Ông Street is known for having a distinct, early 20th-century style Chinese-influenced architecture.

Name	Address	Notes
Hải Thượng Lãn Ông Old Street (Khu phố cổ Hải Thượng Lãn Ông)	Hải Thượng Lãn Ông St., Chợ Lớn ward	Established in 1864. Recognized by the Ho Chi Minh City Department of Culture, Sports and Tourism since July 2010 as "one of the cities' oldest neighborhood blocks", due to substantial preservation of historic architecture.
District 5 Traditional Medicine Street (Phố Đông y Quận 5)	Hải Thượng Lãn Ông St. and Lương Nhữ Học St., Chợ Lớn ward	
District 5 Lantern Street (Phố lồng đèn Quận 5)	Lương Nhữ Học St., Chợ Lớn ward	
Phùng Hưng Stationery Street (Phố văn phòng phẩm Phùng Hưng)	Phùng Hưng St., Chợ Lớn ward	
Chợ Lớn Artificial Flowers Street (Phố hoa vải Chợ Lớn)	Tháp Mười St., Bình Tây ward	
Soài Kinh Lâm Textiles Market (Phố vải Soái Kình Lâm)	18 An Dương Vương, An Đông ward	Formerly & colloquially known as "Soái Kình Lâm Market" (Chợ Soái Kình Lâm)
District 5 Jewelry Quarter (Phố vàng bạc trang sức Quận 5)	Nhiêu Tâm / Nghĩa Thực / Bùi Hữu Nghĩa St., An Đông ward	Surrounds Hòa Bình Market.

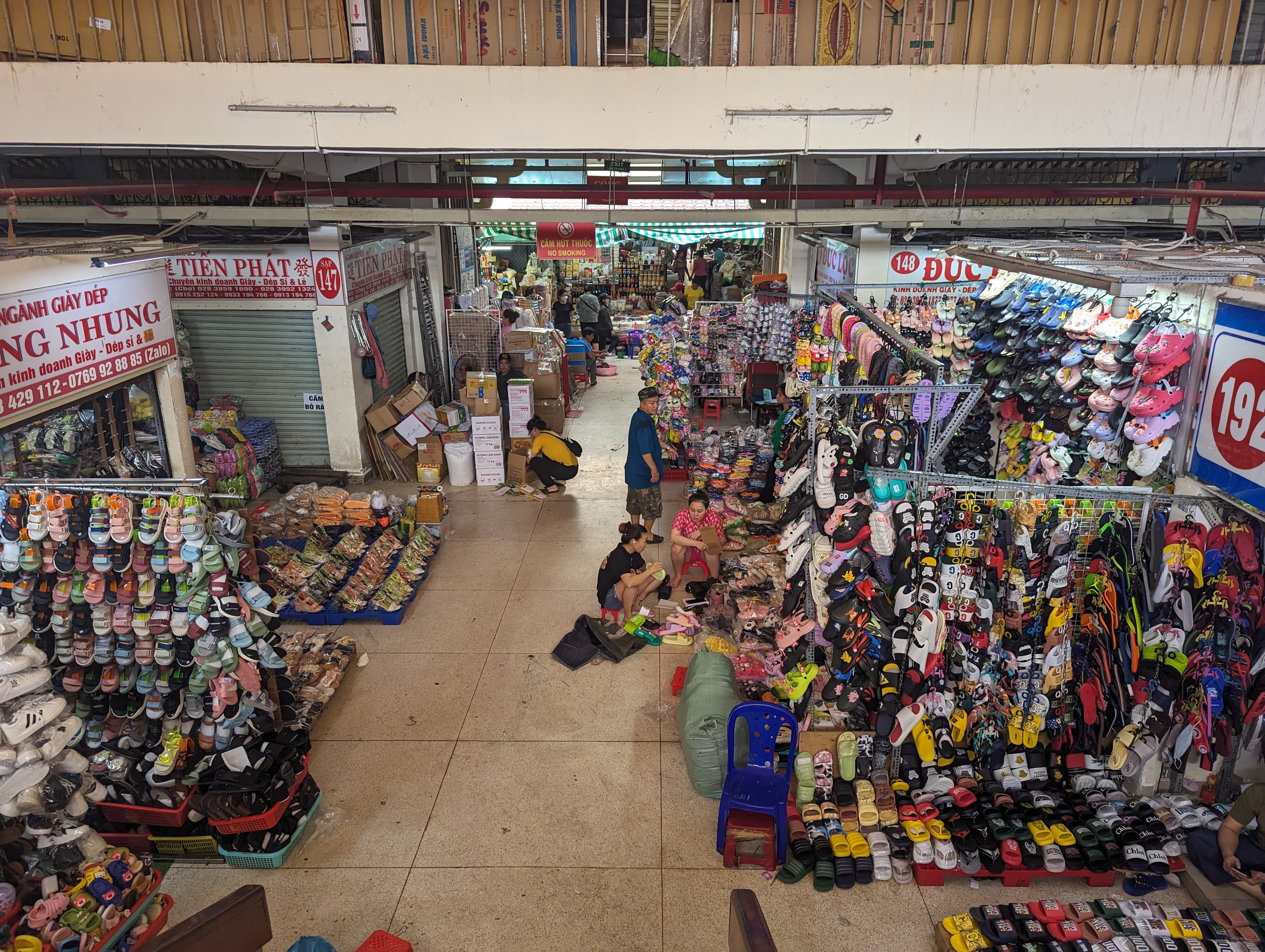
A passageway located inside Bình Tây Market

==== Markets ====
Commerce, especially among the local Chinese community, is also heavily concentrated in Chợ Lớn's most prominent markets, such as Bình Tây Market, An Đông Market, and Kim Biên Market; such markets often consist of hundreds of dense stalls, which are utilized for the sale of wholesale goods.

Bình Tây Market, located in the ward of the same name, is the largest and oldest-surviving market in Chợ Lớn and is known for incorporating various aspects of Chinese architecture. Construction on the market began in 1928 and was completed in 1930; led by a Chinese merchant named Guo Yan (郭琰; Vietnamese: Quách Đàm).

Since 2015, the market has been recognized by Vietnam's Ministry of Culture, Sports and Tourism as one of the city's architectural heritage sites.

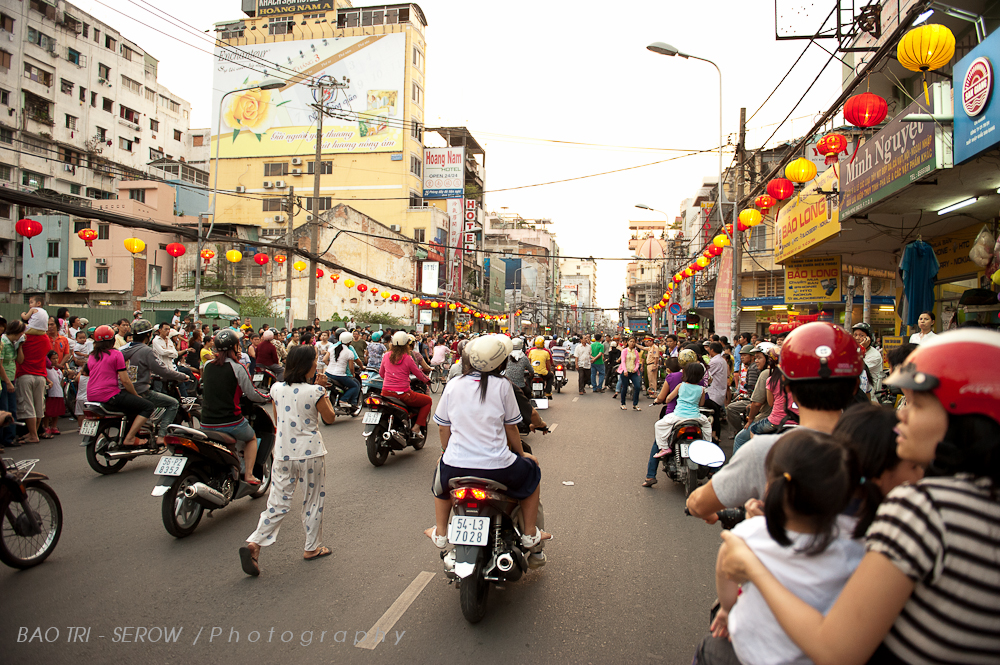
Lanterns set up on the day of the Lantern Festival (Trần Hưng Đạo Street, Chợ Lớn)

=== Festivals ===
The Lantern Festival (元宵節 / Tết Nguyên Tiêu) is celebrated annually on the 15th day of the first lunisolar month, often taking place at religious sites, cultural centers, park exhibits as well as in the form of street parades and lantern-releasing. The festival and its customs have been recognized by Vietnam's Ministry of Culture, Sports and Tourism as one of the country's intangible cultural heritages.

Other notable festivals include the Chợ Lớn Culinary Festival (Note: Known officially as the "Chợ Lớn Food Story Culinary Festival" (Lễ hội ẩm thực Chợ Lớn Food Story)) (Lễ hội ẩm thực Chợ Lớn); a food festival exclusive to Chợ Lớn, which has been held annually in early December since 2023 and is aimed at showcasing a variety of Chinese and Vietnamese cuisine culturally associated with the quarter.

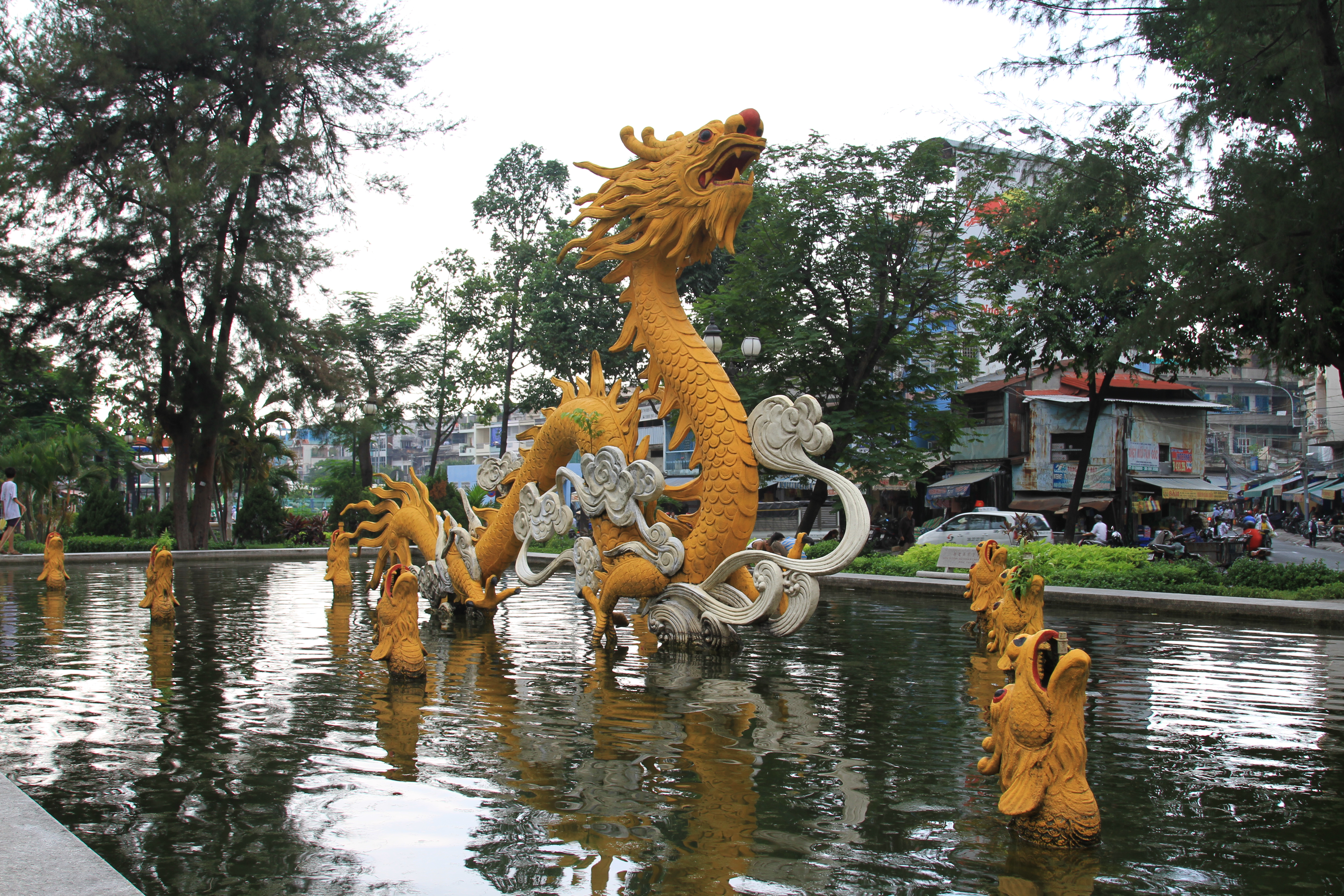
Thăng Long Park

=== Other notable places ===
Name	Address	Notes
Hào Sĩ Phường Alley	Hải Thượng Lãn Ông St., Chợ Lớn ward	
Chợ Quán Hospital Detention Camp (Khu trại giam Bệnh viện Chợ Quán)	190 Hàm Tử, Chợ Quán ward	Prominent for being the place of confinement of revolutionary Trần Phú.
No. 5 Châu Văn Liêm ("Uncle Hồ's House")	5 Châu Văn Liêm, Chợ Lớn ward	Former residence of Hồ Chí Minh (also known as by his other alias, Nguyễn Tất Thành) in Saigon, prior to his journey of "setting out to find a path to national salvation" in 1911.
Văn Lang Park (Công viên Văn Lang)	238 An Dương Vương, An Đông ward	
Thăng Long Park (Công viên Thăng Long)	Hải Thượng Lãn Ông St., Chợ Lớn ward	
Windsor Plaza Hotel	18 An Dương Vương, An Đông ward	
District 5 Cultural Center (Trung tâm Văn hóa Quận 5)	105 Trần Hưng Đạo, An Đông ward	

== Notable residents ==
- Yvon Petra - (1916 - 1984) A French male tennis player, best remembered as the last Frenchman to win the Wimbledon championships men's singles title in 1946.
- Cao Văn Viên - (1921 - 2008) Chief of the Joint General Staff of the Army of the Republic of Vietnam from 1966 to 1975.
- Gontran de Poncins - (1900 - 1962) French author, aristocrat, and adventurer. He resided in Chợ Lớn's Sun Wah hotel, keeping an illustrated journal that was published as From a Chinese City in 1957. "He chose Chợ Lớn, the Chinese riverbank community snuggled up to Saigon, because he suspected the ancient customs of a national culture endure longer in remote colonies than in the motherland. Moreover, he also studied ancient China."
- Trần Văn Lắm (1913 - 2001), Minister of Foreign Affairs of the Republic of Vietnam from 1969 to 1973.
- Wan Kwong (Chinese: 尹光), born Lui Minkwong (呂明光) - (b. 1944) Hong Kong singer
