= History of the Ho Chi Minh City Metro =

Metro train plans that were never enacted, Vietnam

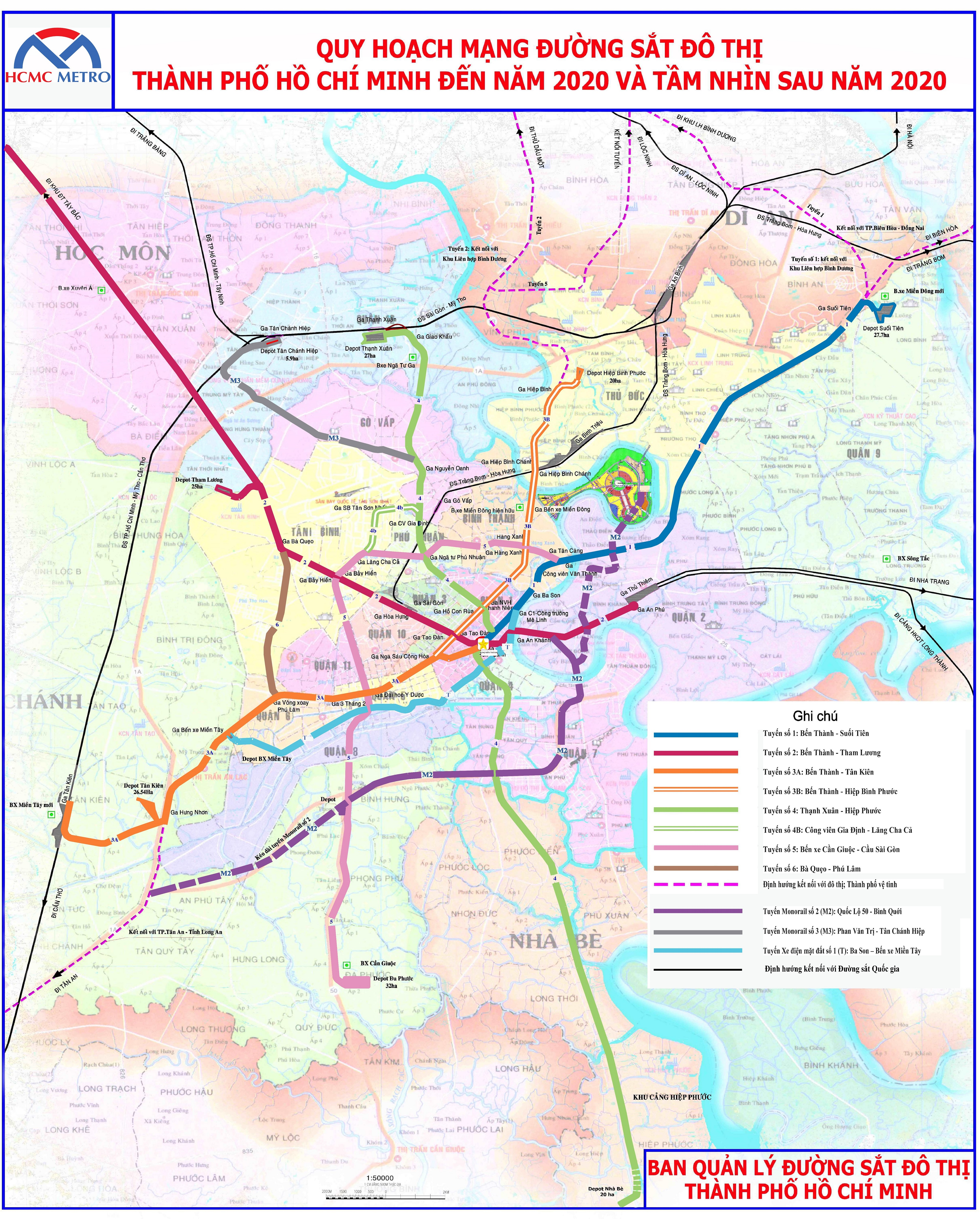
- The 2020 official provision of the Ho Chi Minh City Metro's network

Overview
- Status: L1 in operation L2 under construction
- Locale: Ho Chi Minh City, Vietnam

Service
- Type: Rapid transit
- System: Ho Chi Minh City Metro

Technical
- Character: Underground & Elevated
- Track gauge: 1,435 mm (4 ft 8 1/2 in) standard gauge

The history of the Ho Chi Minh City Metro includes early plans for the Ho Chi Minh City Metro which ultimately did not go ahead. The current plans which began construction in 2012 is an evolution of the earlier proposals.

== Initial 2001 plan ==
The original proposal was submitted in 2001 and would consist of six lines.

2001 master plan
Line description	Length (km)	Stations
Northwest–Southwest (including Bến Thành–Tân Sơn Nhất Airport)	46.86	44
Inner Belt (including Bến Thành–Bình Tây Market, Cholon)	43.14	45
Tân Sơn Nhất Airport	9.3	9
Hòa Hưng, District 10–Hanoi Highway–Thủ Thiêm, District 2	21	18
Bến Thành Market - District 2–District 9 - Thủ Đức District	27.5	18
Hòa Hưng, District 10–Hiệp Bình Chánh, Thủ Đức District–Biên Hòa	46	42

=== Priority lines ===
Three lines were considered a priority of the 2001 plan, two of them fully or partly underground and one fully elevated:

1. A 7.5-kilometre (4.7 mi) north–south line, partly underground and partly elevated, connecting Tan Son Nhat Airport and Bến Thành Market, via Hòa Hưng in District 10;
2. A 7-kilometre (4.3 mi) east–west line, fully underground, connecting Bến Thành Market with Bình Tây Market in Cholon, similar to Line 3 of the 2007 plan;
3. An 11-kilometre (6.8 mi) southwest–northeast line, fully elevated, connecting Hòa Hưng in District 10 to Binh Trieu in Thủ Đức District, following existing railway lines.

Proposed extensions to these lines included: extending the Tan Son Nhat line north to Quang Trung Software Park, eventually expanding further to the northwest and southwest to create a much longer 47 km line; extending the Bình Tây/Cholon line to form a circular "Inner Belt" Line, which would loop around the airport; and building a doubletrack elevated express line to extend the Hòa Hưng-Binh Trieu line out to Biên Hòa.

=== Other lines ===
Other lines to be built according to the 2001 plan included a 27.5-kilometre (17.1 mi) line connecting Bến Thành Market to Thủ Đức District, via Districts 2 and 9, similar to (but distinct from) Line 1 of the 2007 plan, and a 16-kilometre (9.9 mi) line from Hòa Hưng in District 10 to Bình Chánh District.

Several more inter-city rail lines were planned, including a Long Binh-Hóc Môn route, a Hóc Môn–Bình Chánh–Tiền Giang route, a Thủ Đức–Long Bình–Long Thành–Vũng Tàu route and a Thủ Thiêm–Long Bình–Vũng Tàu route.

=== Technical specifications ===
The 2001 plan proposed the following technical parameters:

- Platform length: 125 metres (410 ft)
- Average distance between stations 700–1,300 metres (2,300–4,300 ft)
- Maximum speed: 80 kilometres per hour (50 mph)
- Headway: 4 min. (min. 2 min.)
- Gauge: 1,435 mm (4 ft 8 1/2 in) standard gauge
- Vehicle width: 3 metres (9.8 ft)

== Revised plan in 2007 ==
The Ho Chi Minh City Metro project is managed by the city's Management Authority for Urban Railways (MAUR), a government unit working directly under the Chairman of the People's Committee of Ho Chi Minh City. The 2007 plan put forth by this unit calls for no less than six urban rail lines. Bến Thành Market in District 1, already a major hub for bus traffic, will become a major hub connecting several lines.

2007 master plan
Line	Length (km)	Stations	Route
1	19.7	14	Bến Thành Market–Suối Tiên Park, District 9
2	11.3	11	Bến Thành Market–Tham Lương, District 12
3	10.4	?	Bến Thành Market–Bình Tân
4	16	?	Lăng Cha Cả, Tân Bình–Văn Thánh Park, Bình Thạnh District
5	17	?	Thủ Thiêm, District 2–Cần Giuộc, District 8
6	6	?	Bà Queo, Tân Bình–Phú Lâm, District 6

=== Line 1 ===
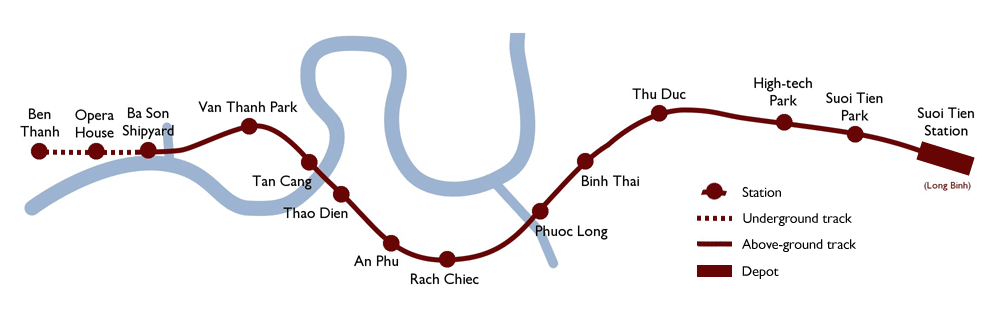
The proposed map of Line 1 in 2007

On 10 April 2007, the city government approved the US$1.1 billion Line 1. It will run for 19.7 km from Ben Thanh station, underground for 2.6 km past the Opera House, Ba Son Shipyard, and then cross the Saigon River on an elevated track, passing through District 2 on the way to Suối Tiên Park and the terminus in Long Bình in District 9. In total, Line 1 will include 14 stations, with three of these being underground.

Work to build a US$28 million depot in Long Binh for Line 1 began on 21 February 2008. Construction of the elevated section, east of the Saigon River, started in August 2012. The contract for the 3-station underground segment was to follow shortly after. The Japan Bank for International Cooperation will provide US$904.7 million to meet 83% of the cost, and the city government US$186.6 million.

Completion of Line 1 was originally planned for early 2018, but is now planned for 2024. Planners expect the route to serve more than 160,000 passengers daily upon launch, increasing to 635,000 by 2030 and 800,000 by 2040. All stations along the route are expected to accommodate the disabled, with automatic ticket vending machines, telephone booths, restrooms, subway doors and information bulletins accessible to the handicapped and visually impaired.

=== Line 2 ===
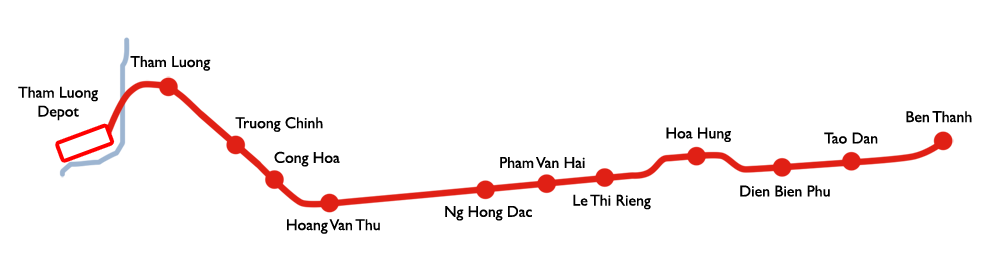
The proposed map of Line 2 in 2007

Plans for the US$1.2 billion Line 2 were submitted in November 2008 by MVA Asia Limited and approved by the government in December 2008. This line will include 11 stations stretching between Bến Thành and Tham Luong in District 12, following a route through Pham Hong Thai, Cach Mang Thang Tam and Trường Chinh streets. Out of the main section's total length of 11.3 km, 9.6 km will be underground. Major stations will include Trường Chinh (Tay Ninh Bus Station), near Tan Son Nhat Airport, and Hòa Hưng, near Saigon Railway Station. An extension of Line 2 east of Bến Thành Market to Thủ Thiêm New was originally proposed by MVA; this extension would bring the line's total length to 19 km.

The project's projected cost will be financed by the German Bank for Reconstruction, the Asian Development Bank and the European Investment Bank. In February 2008, the German government announced EUR 86 million of funding towards the project. Metro line No. 2 was scheduled to start construction in 2013, but due to various difficulties, HCM has asked the Government to delay to 2020. This line is expected to be completed in 2030.

=== Line 3 ===
The third metro line would span the distance between Bến Thành Market to the east and An Lac in Bình Tân District to the west, passing through Districts 5 and 6—the area known as Cholon, or "Chinatown". Fewer details have emerged about the third line than the others, although the city's People's Committee is reported to have approached the French government for funding and support. A 2006 document suggested a possible extension of Line 3 north of Bến Thành Market to Thủ Đức District, although officials have yet to confirm whether this extension will be built.

=== Line 4 ===
Spanish consulting company Ardanuy Ingenieria won a contract in October 2009 to provide a feasibility study of Line 4 of the six-line project. This line would stretch 16 km from Lang Cha Ca crossroad in Tân Bình District (near Tan Son Nhat Airport) to Van Thanh Park in Bình Thạnh District.

=== Lines 5-6 ===
On 4 April 2009, Spain's IDOM, Ingeniería, Arquitectura y Consultoría S.A. signed a contract with HCMC Urban Railway to provide a feasibility study for lines 5 (from Thủ Thiêm, District 2 to Can Giuoc, District 8 – 20 km) and 6 (Ba Queo, Tân Bình to Phu Lam, District 6 – 6 km). The study was to be completed within 12 months.

In September 2010 Spanish company GEV signed an agreement with HCM City's Management Board of Urban Railway to build the first phase of the Metro 5 route between Sai Gon Bridge and Bay Hien Intersection in Tân Bình District. Work on the route is expected to begin by the end of April 2011.

In September 2013 agreement was reached with the Asian Development Bank, the European Investment Bank, and the Spanish Government to provide Euro850m to finance the construction of line 5 - with any additional provided by the Vietnamese Government. A revised construction start of 2015 was provided.

=== Other lines ===
China Shanghai Corporation for Foreign Economic & Technological Cooperation (Sfeco) has carried out a pre-feasibility study for a 12 km Nguyen Oanh-Nguyen Van Linh Metro route, between Gò Vấp District and District 4. A 2006 document indicated that a subsidiary line connecting the line to Tan Son Nhat Airport and a southward extension to Nhà Bè District may have been considered.

== 2009 plans ==
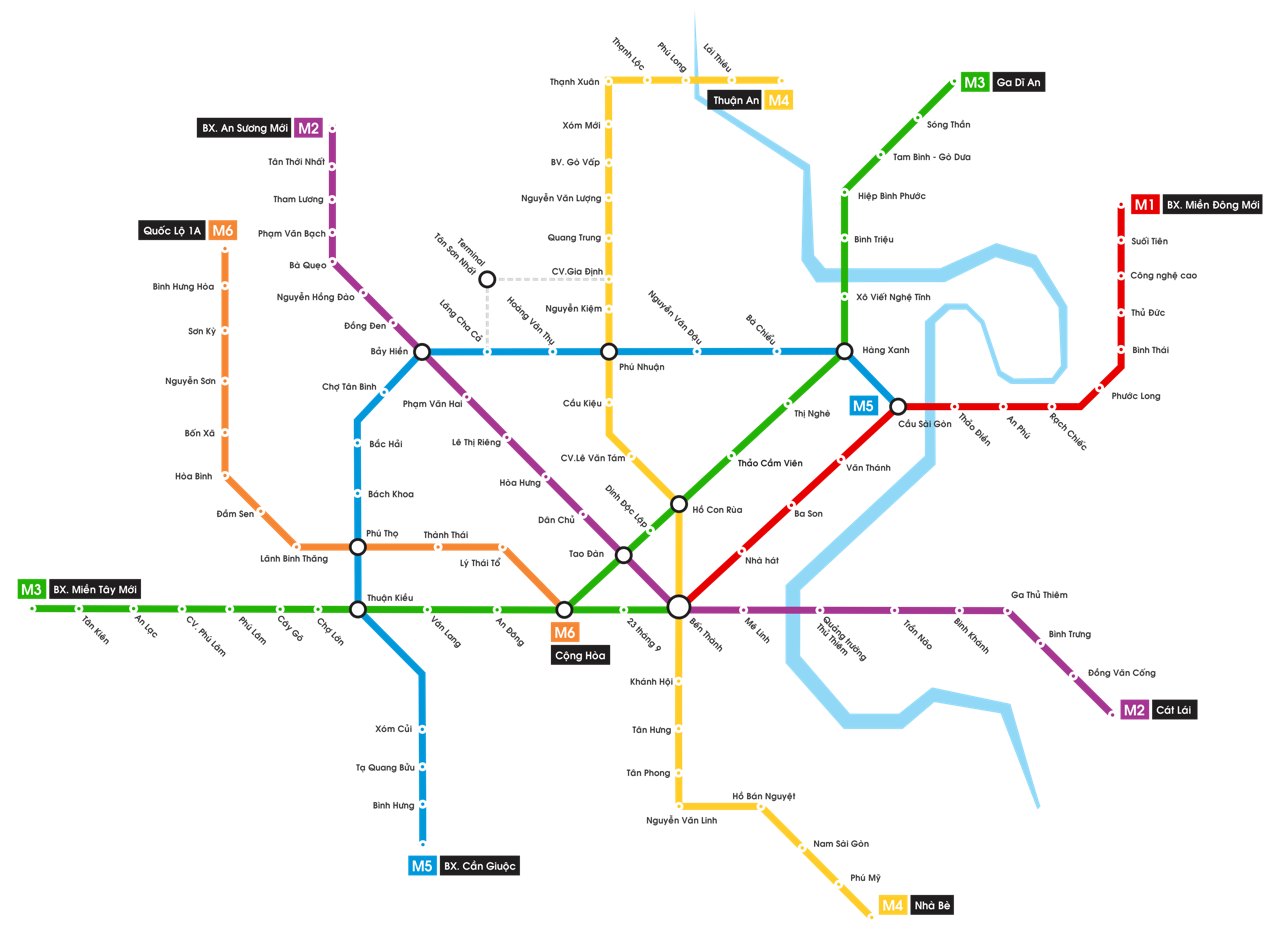
Ho Chi Minh City Metro network back then.

2009 master plan
Line	Length (km)	Stations	Character	Route
1	19.7 (2.6 underground & 17.1 elevated)	14 (3 underground, 11 elevated)	underground & elevated	Bến Thành - Suối Tiên
2	phase 1: 11.3 (9.5 underground & 1.8 elevated) phase 2: 7.7	phase 1: 11 (10 underground, 1 elevated) phase 2: ?	underground & elevated	phase 1: Bến Thành - Tham Lương phase 2: Thủ Thiêm - Bến Thành & Tham Lương – Tây Ninh Terminal
3A	phase 1: 9.7 (underground) phase 2: 6.5	phase 1: 10 underground phase 2: ?	underground & elevated	phase 1: Bến Thành - Western Terminal phase 2: Western Terminal - Tân Kiên
3B	12.1 (9.1 underground & 3 elevated).	10 (8 underground, 2 elevated)	underground & elevated	Cộng Hòa Junction - Hiệp Bình Phước
4A	24 (19 underground & 5 elevated)	20 (15 underground, 5 elevated)	underground & elevated	Thạnh Xuân (District 12) - Nguyễn Văn Linh (District 7)
4B	5.2	—N/a	underground	Gia Định Park - Tân Sơn Nhất Airport - Lăng Cha Cả
5	phase 1: 8.9 (underground) phase 2: 14.8 (7.4 underground & 7.4 elevated)	phase 1: 9 (8 underground, 1 elevated) phase 2: 13 (7 underground, 6 elevated)	underground & elevated	Bảy Hiền Junction – Saigon Bridge Bảy Hiền Junction – New Cần Giuộc Bus Station
6	6.7 (underground)	7 underground	underground	Trường Chinh - Phú Lâm Roundabout

== 2013 plans (used until Dec. 31 2024) ==
2013 master plan
Line	Route	Length (km)	Stations	Character	Notes
1	Bến Thành - Suối Tiên Terminal	19.7	14	underground & elevated	Began operation since Dec. 22 2024
2	Thủ Thiêm - Bến Thành (phase 2); Bến Thành - Tham Lương (phase 1); Tham Lương - An Sương Terminal (phase 2); An Sương Terminal - Provincial Road 7 (Củ Chi) (phase 3)	48	42	underground & elevated	
3A	Bến Thành - Tân Kiên	19.8	18	underground & elevated	Project cancelled Merged the Bến Thành - Cộng Hòa Junction section into Line 1 and the other sections with Line 3B to make a new Line 3
3B	Cộng Hòa Junction - Hiệp Bình Phước	12.2	11	underground & elevated	Project cancelled Merged with most of Line 3A to make a new Line 3
4	Thạnh Xuân - Hiệp Phước	35.7	32	underground & elevated	
4B	Gia Định Park - Tân Sơn Nhất Airport - Hoàng Văn Thụ Park	3.4	3	underground	Project cancelled Merged into Line 4
5	Tân Cảng - New Cần Giuộc Bus Station	23.4	22	underground & elevated	
6	Bà Quẹo - Phú Lâm Roundabout	6.7	7	underground	
M2	Thanh Đa - Nguyễn Văn Linh	27.2	17	elevated	Project cancelled Change into a part of MRT Line 7
M3	Gò Vấp Junction - Tân Chánh Hiệp	16.5	8	elevated	Project cancelled Change into a part of MRT Line 8
T	Mê Linh Square - Western Terminal	12.8	23	on ground	Project cancelled Part of LRT Line 11
