= Bình Tây =

Bình Tây Phường Bình Tây
- Ward
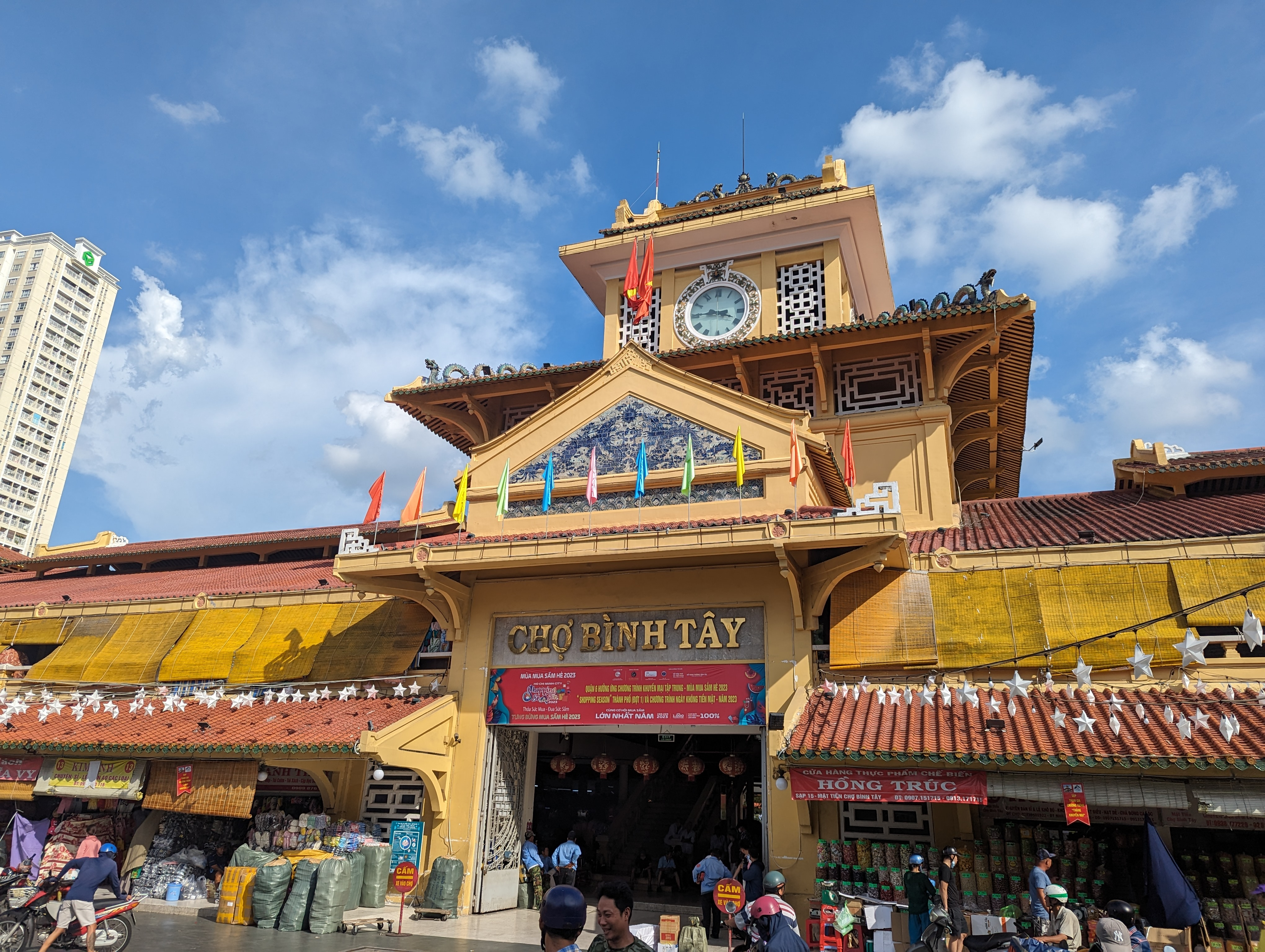
- Bình Tây Market
- Interactive map of Bình Tây
- Coordinates: 10°45′00″N 106°39′01″E
- Country: Vietnam
- Municipality: Ho Chi Minh City
- Established: June 16, 2025

Area
  - Total: 0.41 sq mi (1.05 km^{2})

Population (2024)
  - Total: 63,293
  - Density: 156,000/sq mi (60,300/km^{2})
- Time zone: UTC+07:00 (Indochina Time)
- Administrative code: 27367

Bình Tây (Vietnamese: Phường Bình Tây) is a ward of Ho Chi Minh City, Vietnam. It is one of the 168 new wards, communes and special zones of the city following the reorganization in 2025.

== Geography ==
Bình Tây ward is 7 kilometers west of Saigon ward, it is bordered by:

- Minh Phụng to the north
- Chợ Lớn to the east
- Bình Tiên to the south
- Bình Phú and Phú Lâm to the west

According to Official Dispatch No. 2896/BNV-CQĐP dated May 27, 2025 of the Ministry of Home Affairs, following the merger, Bình Tây has a land area of 1.05 km², the population as of December 31, 2024 is 63,293 people, the population density is 60,279 people/km².

== History ==
On June 16, 2025, the National Assembly Standing Committee issued Resolution No. 1685/NQ-UBTVQH15 on the arrangement of commune-level administrative units of Ho Chi Minh City in 2025 (effective from June 16, 2025). Accordingly, the entire land area and population of Ward 2 and Ward 9 of the former District 6 will be integrated into a new ward named Bình Tây (Clause 14, Article 1).

== Gallery ==
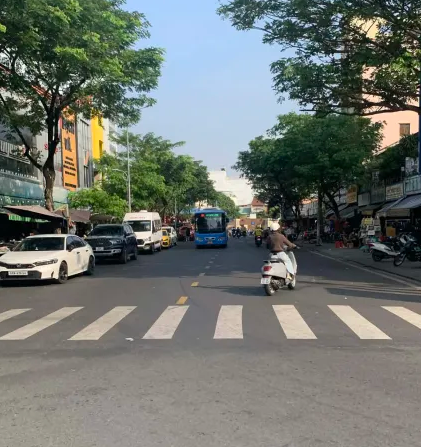
Crosswalk in Bình Tây

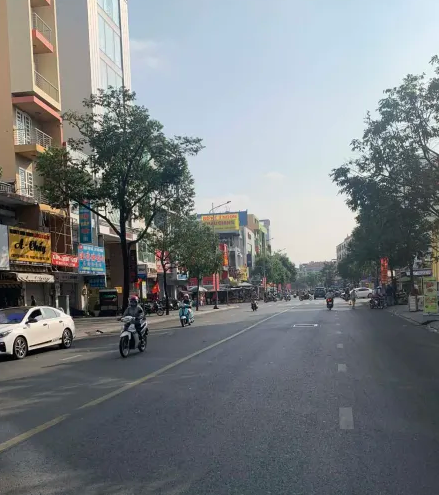
Hậu Giang Road
