= Minh Phụng =

Minh Phụng Phường Minh Phụng
- Ward
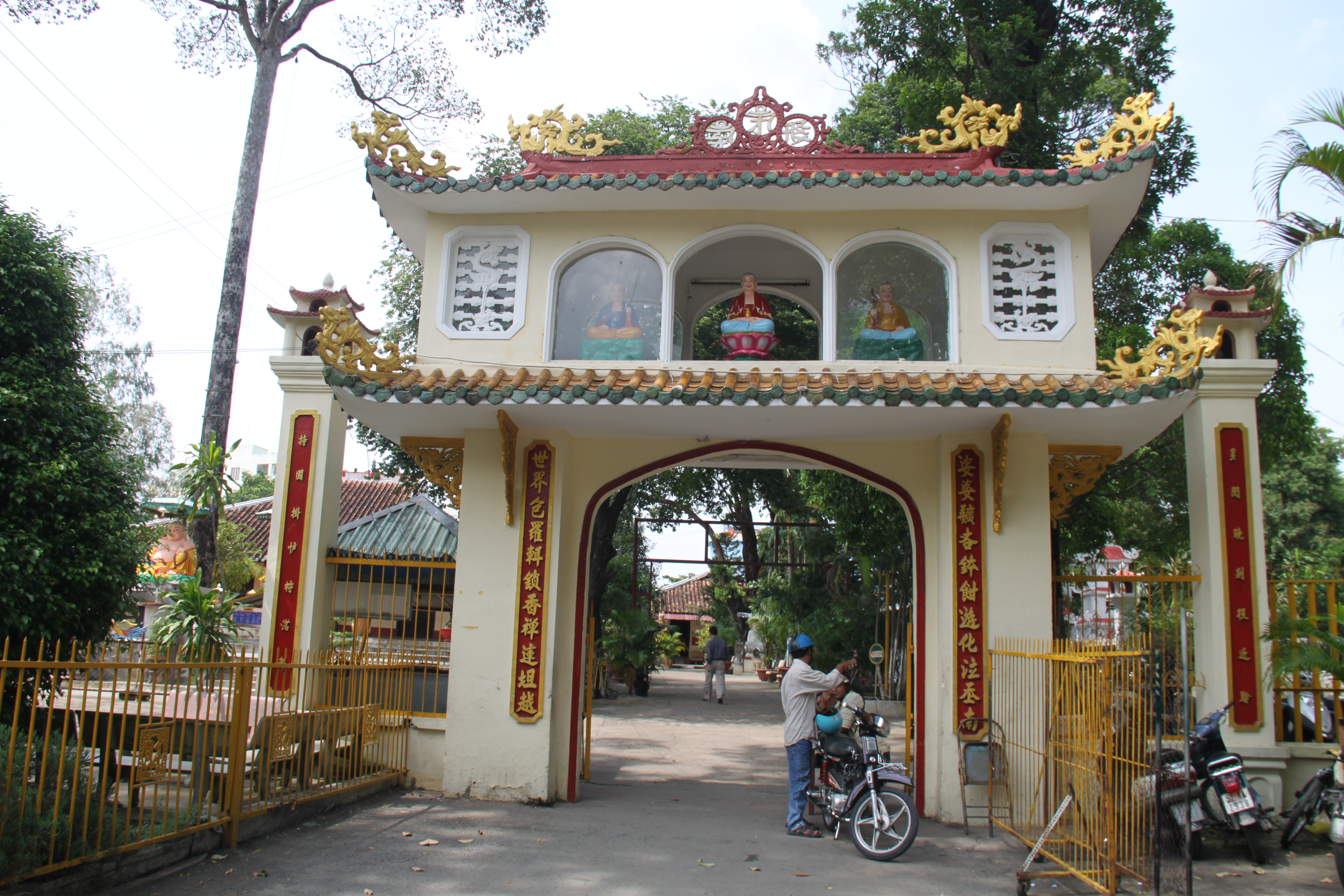
- Phụng Sơn Pagoda
- Interactive map of Minh Phụng
- Coordinates: 10°45′19″N 106°38′54″E
- Country: Vietnam
- Municipality: Ho Chi Minh City
- Established: June 16, 2025

Area
  - Total: 0.49 sq mi (1.27 km^{2})

Population (2024)
  - Total: 90,808
  - Density: 185,000/sq mi (71,500/km^{2})
- Time zone: UTC+07:00 (Indochina Time)
- Administrative code: 27238

Minh Phụng (Vietnamese: Phường Minh Phụng) is a ward of Ho Chi Minh City, Vietnam. It is one of the 168 new wards, communes and special zones of the city following the reorganization in 2025.

== Geography ==
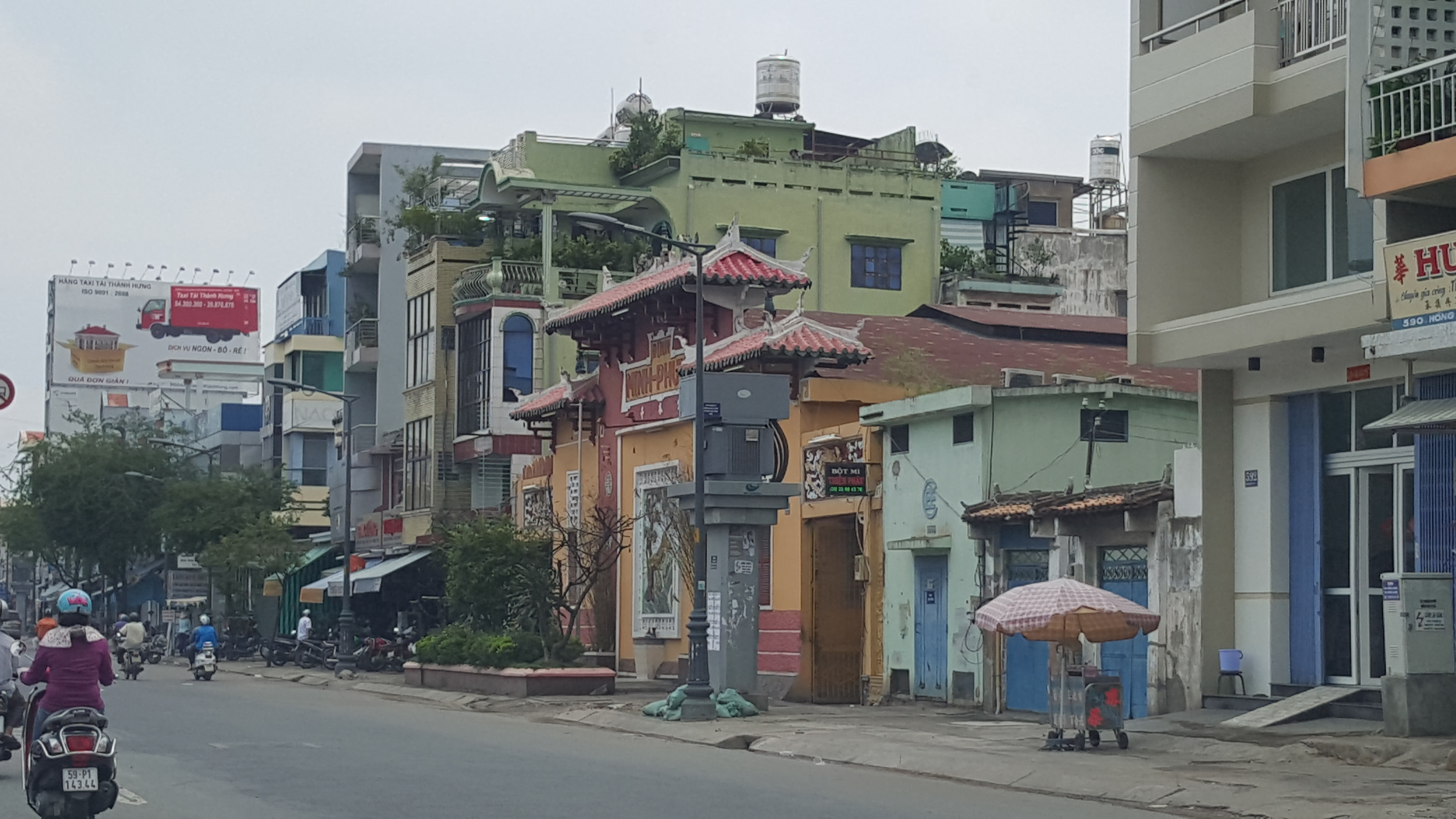
Minh Phụng Village Temple on Hồng Bàng Boulevard, borderline of Minh Phụng and Bình Tây wards

Minh Phụng has geographical location:

- The north borders Phú Thọ and Bình Thới February 3rd Boulevard with roads of Hàn Hải Nguyên – Lạc Long Quân
- The west borders Phú Lâm by Tân Hóa Road
- The south borders Bình Tây by Hồng Bàng Boulevard
- The southeast borders Chợ Lớn by streets of Nguyễn Chí Thanh –
- The east borders Diên Hồng by Lý Thường Kiệt Street

According to Official Dispatch No. 2896/BNV-CQĐP dated May 27, 2025 of the Ministry of Home Affairs, following the merger, Minh Phụng has a land area of 1.27 km², the population as of December 31, 2024 is 90,808 people, the population density is 71,502 people/km².

== History ==
On June 16, 2025, the National Assembly Standing Committee issued Resolution No. 1685/NQ-UBTVQH15 on the arrangement of commune-level administrative units of Ho Chi Minh City in 2025 (effective from June 16, 2025). Accordingly, the entire land area and population of Ward 1, Ward 7 and Ward 16 of the former District 11 will be integrated into a new ward named Minh Phụng (Clause 28, Article 1).
