= District 6, Ho Chi Minh City =

District 6 Quận 6
- Urban district
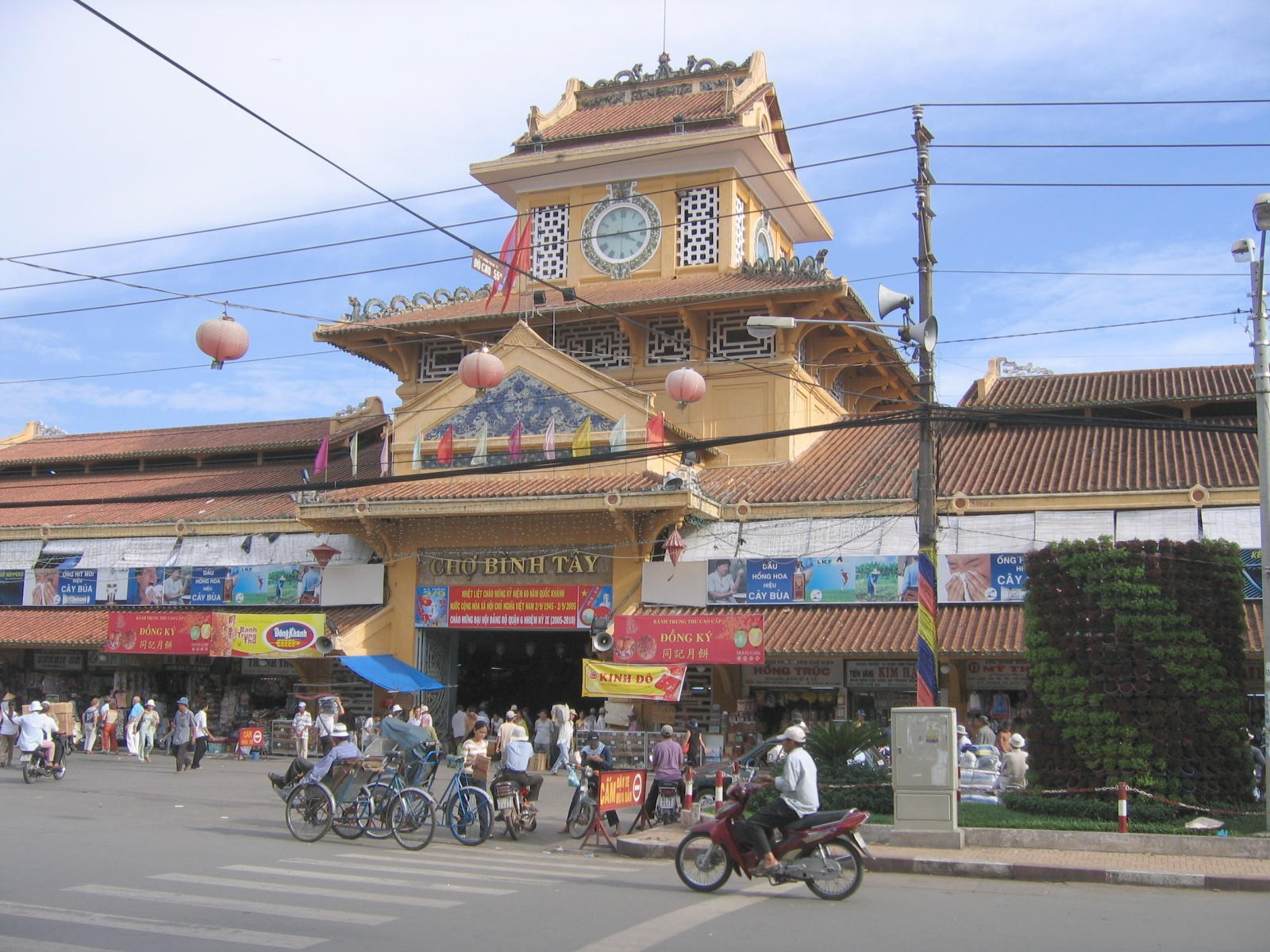
- Bình Tây Market, Chợ Lớn

- Position in HCMC's core

- Location within Vietnam
- Coordinates: 10°44′46″N 106°38′10″E
- Country: Vietnam
- Centrally governed city: Ho Chi Minh City
- Seat: 107 Cao Văn Lầu
- Wards: 14 phường

Area
  - Total: 7 km^{2} (2.7 sq mi)

Population
  - Total: 271,050
  - Density: 39,000/km^{2} (100,000/sq mi)

Demographics
  - Main ethnic groups: Kinh, Chinese
- Time zone: UTC+07 (ICT)
- Website: quan6.hochiminhcity.gov.vn

District 6 (Vietnamese: Quận 6) is a former urban district (quận) of Ho Chi Minh City, the largest city in Vietnam. As of 2010, the district had a population of 253,474 and an area of 7 km^{2} (2.7 sq mi). It is divided into 14 small subsets which are called wards (phường), numbered from Ward 1 to Ward 14.

== Geographical location ==
District 6 borders District 11 and Tân Phú District to the north, District 5 to the east, District 8 to the south, and Bình Tân District to the west. The district has an area of 7.14 km^{2}, population in 2019 is 233,561 people, population density is 32,712 people/km^{2}.

== History ==
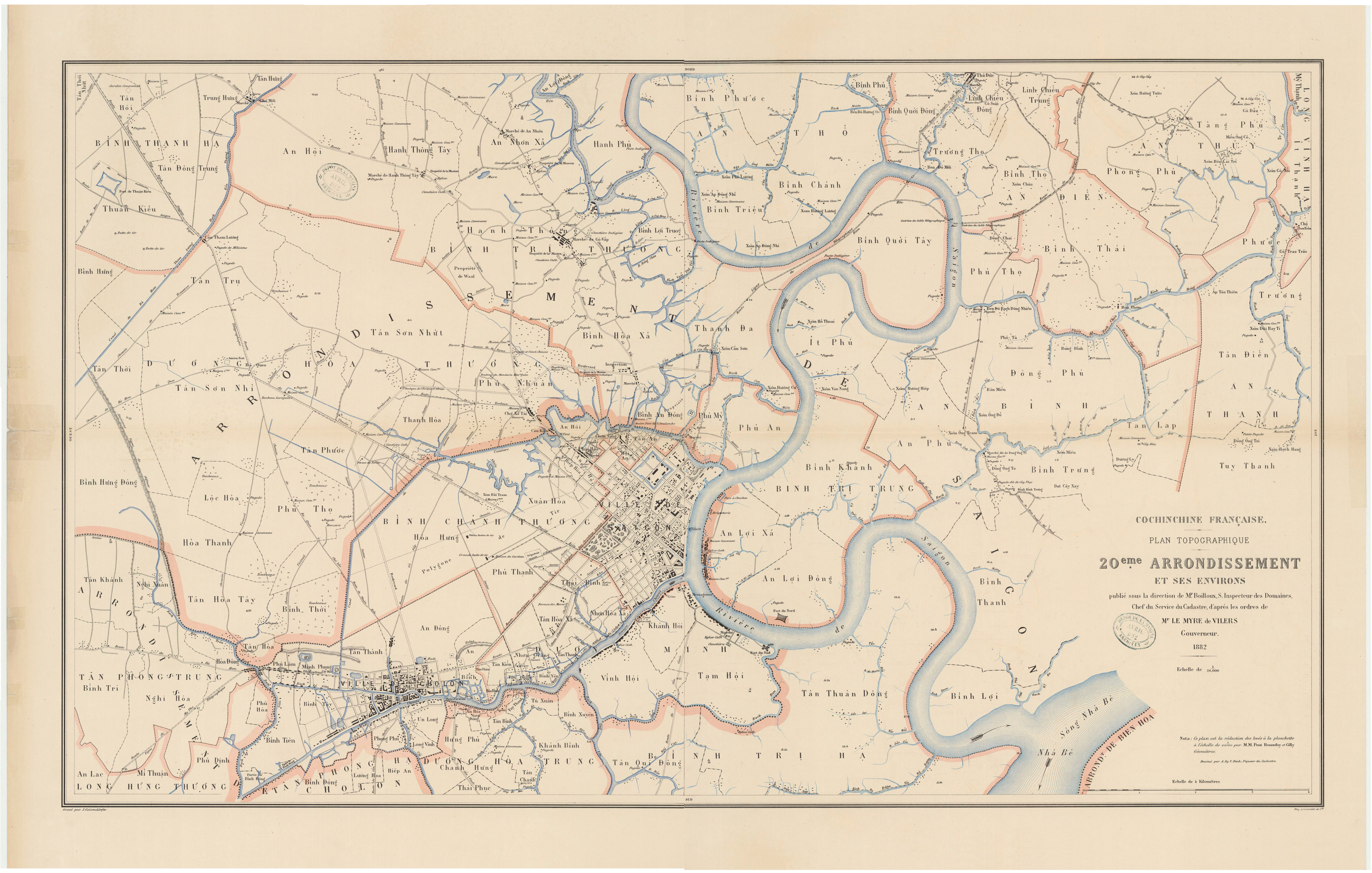
Map of District 20, an administrative unit established by the Governor of Cochinchina in 1880. District 6 today corresponds to the villages of Binh Tay, Binh Tien, Minh Phung, Phu Lam in the western area of Cho Lon city (at that time only expanded to Lo Gom canal ), and some villages at that time were still on the outskirts of the city such as Hoa Dong (Tan Phong Trung commune), Phu Hoa, Phu Dinh (Long Hung Thuong commune).

On September 22, 1941, Saigon - Cho Lon area established District 6. District 6 at that time belonged to the old Saigon city area before 1931, today belongs to District 4 of Ho Chi Minh City.

On June 16, 2025, the Standing Committee of the National Assembly issued Resolution No. 1685/NQ-UBTVQH15. District 6 was dissolved and new wards were rearranged specifically as follows:

- Binh Tien
- Binh Tay
- Binh Phu
- Phu Lam
