= District 11, Ho Chi Minh City =

District 11 Quận 11
- Urban district
- Position in HCMC's core

- Location within Vietnam
- Coordinates: 10°46′1″N 106°38′44″E
- Country: Vietnam
- Centrally governed city: Ho Chi Minh City
- Wards: 16 phường

Area
  - Total: 5 km^{2} (1.9 sq mi)

Population (2013)
  - Total: 332,536
  - Density: 67,000/km^{2} (170,000/sq mi)

Demographics
  - Main ethnic groups: Kinh, Hoa
- Time zone: UTC+07 (ICT)
- Website: quan11.hochiminhcity.gov.vn

District 11 (Vietnamese: Quận 11) is a former urban district (quận) of Ho Chi Minh City, the largest city in Vietnam. As of 2010, the district had a population of 232,536 and an area of 5 km^{2} (1.9 sq mi). It is divided into 16 small subsets which are called wards (phường), numbered from Ward 1 to Ward 16.

== Geographical location ==
District 11 borders Tân Bình District to the north, District 5 to the south, District 6 and Tân Phú District to the west, and District 10 to the east.

== Cultural spots ==
- Đầm Sen Park
- Phú Thọ Indoor Stadium
