= Bình Tây Market =

- Chợ Bình Tây (Vietnamese) 平西市場 (Chinese)
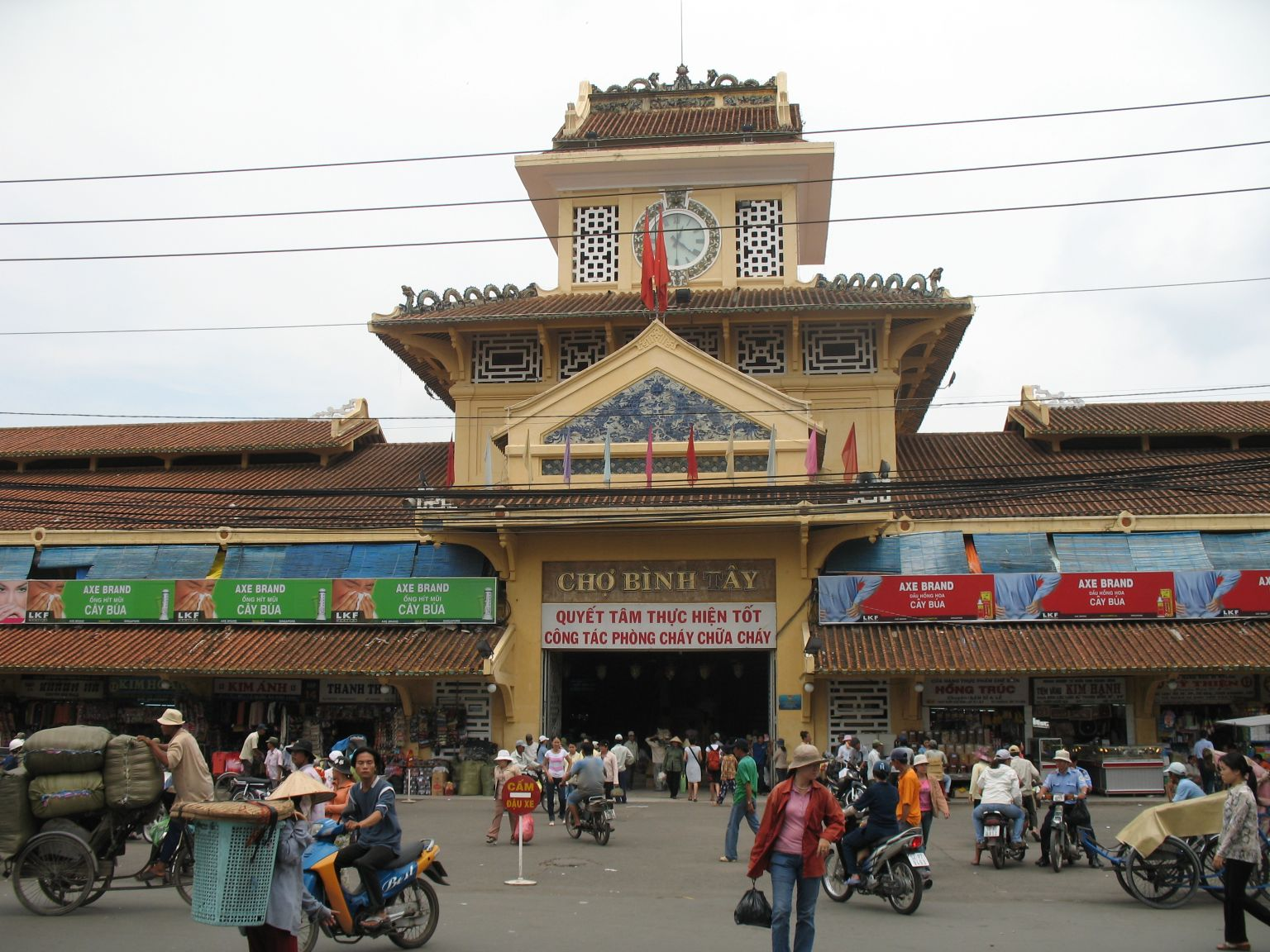
- Interactive map of the Bình Tây Market area
- Alternative names: Chợ Lớn mới lit. 'new Big Market (in reference to Chợ Lớn)'

General information
- Type: Traditional market
- Architectural style: Chinese architecture
- Classification: Artistic architectural monument
- Location: 57A Tháp Mười, Bình Tây ward, Ho Chi Minh City, Vietnam
- Coordinates: 10°44′58″N 106°39′04″E
- Construction started: 1928
- Opened: 1930; 96 years ago
- Renovated: 1992, 2016-2018
- Renovation cost: VNĐ104 billion (2016)
- Client: Guo Yan

Height
- Height: 13.1 metres (43 ft)

Technical details
- Size: Length: 89.2 metres (293 ft); Width: 108.6 metres (356 ft)
- Floor area: 2.5 hectares (6.2 acres)

Design and construction
- Main contractor: Tàu Cuốc Company (Xáng Company)

Bình Tây Market (Vietnamese: Chợ Bình Tây, Chinese: 平西市場) is the largest market in Chợ Lớn; located in Bình Tây ward, Ho Chi Minh City, Vietnam. Prior to 1975, it was also referred to as "Chợ Lớn mới". (lit. 'new big market') to differentiate from its predecessor, "Chợ Lớn cũ" (lit. 'old / former big market').

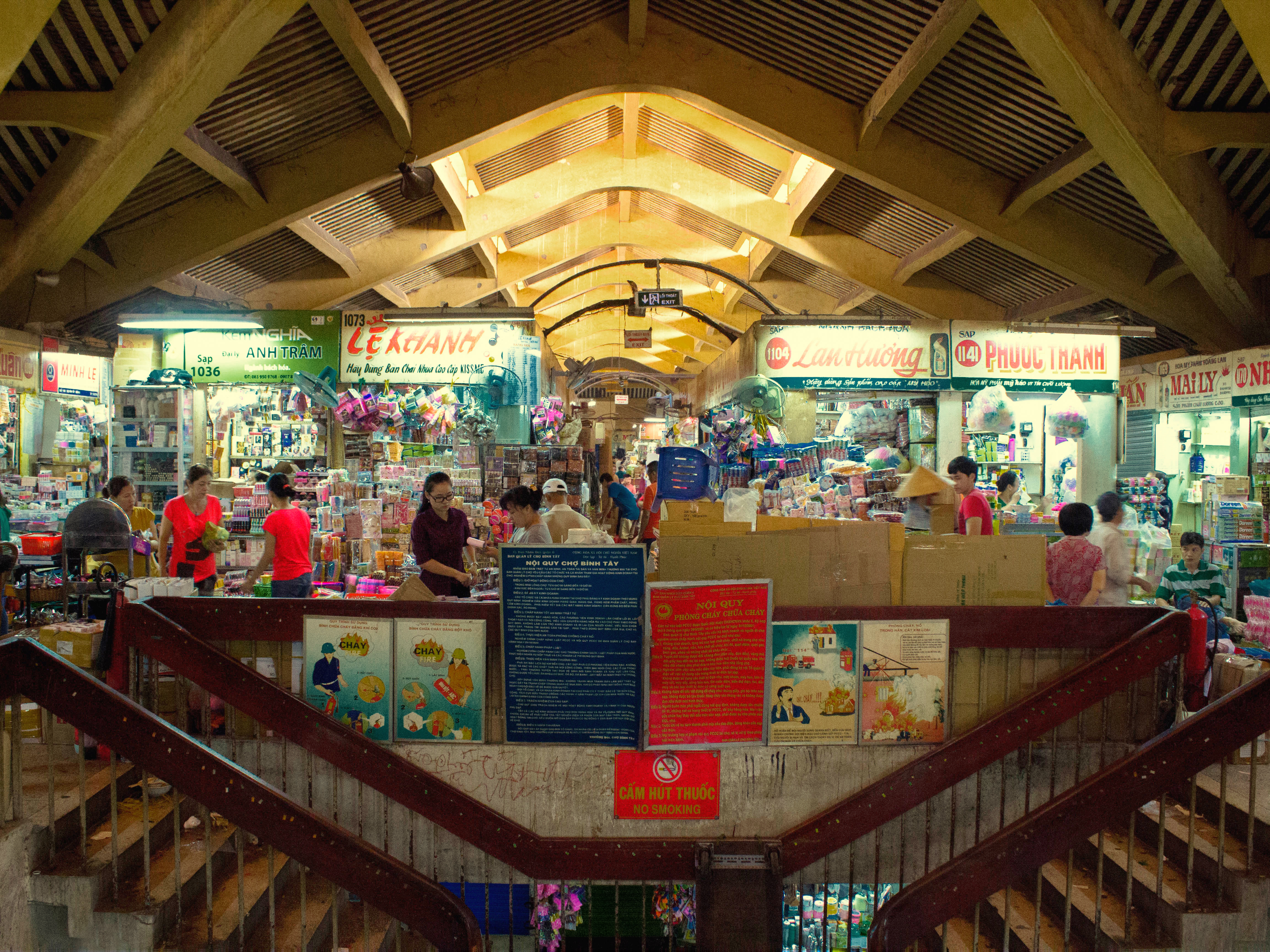
The market interior

Prior to the market's construction in 1928, there had, in its place, existed another market (located in modern-day Chợ Lớn Post Office). Nicknamed the "Old Market" (Vietnamese: Chợ Lớn cũ; Chinese: 舊街市), its subsequent destruction during a fire led to construction of the "New Market" (modern-day Bình Tây Market), hence its alias.

== Geography ==
Bình Tây Market sits on a four street-block span, bounded by Tháp Mười Street to the north, Lê Tấn Kế Street to the west, Trần Bình Street to the east, and Hậu Giang Street to the south.

== History ==
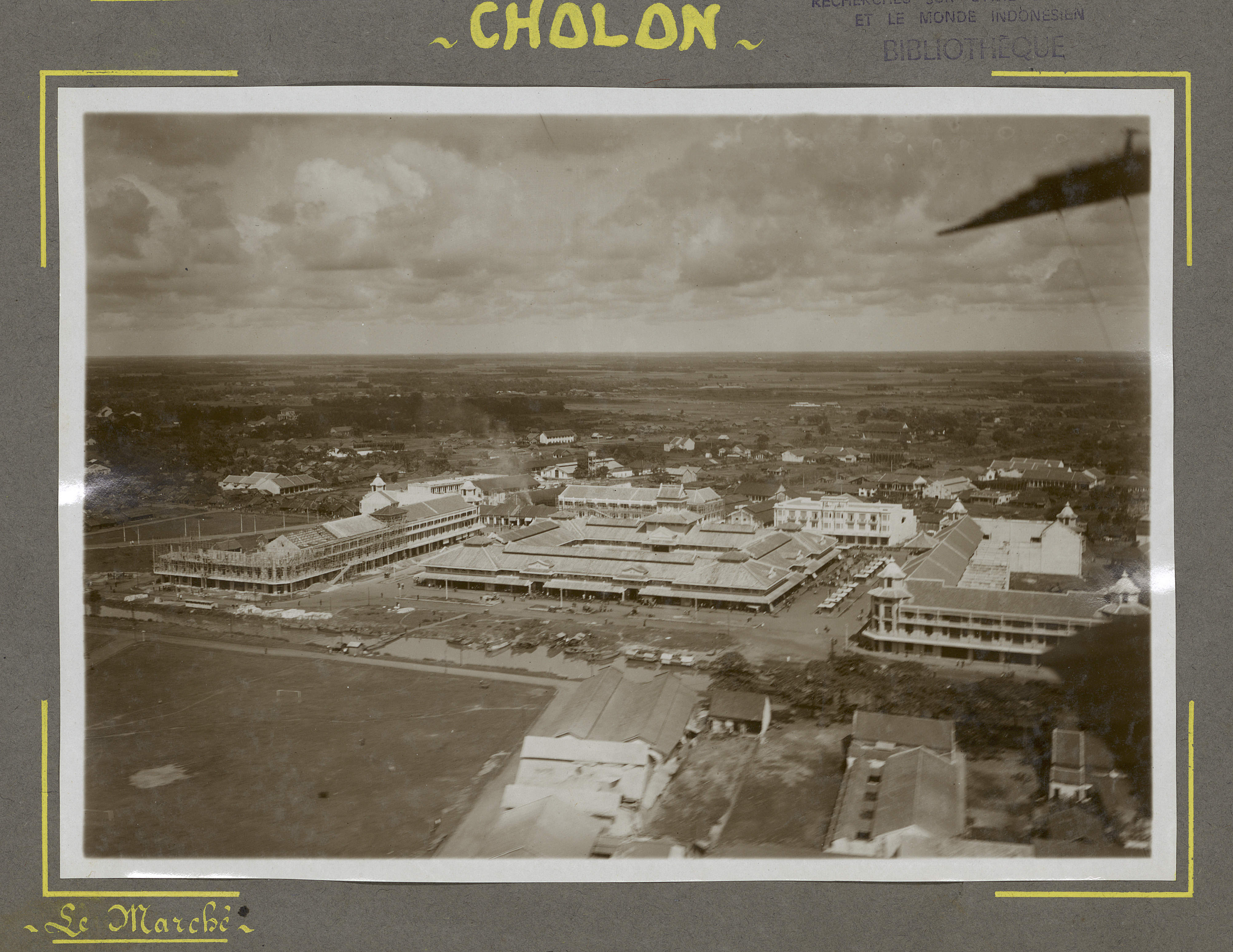
Aerial photograph of the back side of Bình Tây Market, circa 1930

Bình Tây Market was built, or at least financially supported, by a Chinese businessman named Guo Yan (郭琰; Vietnamese: Quách Đàm), originally hailing from Chaozhou in Guangdong. Quách Đàm operated his businesses under the trade name of Thông Hiệp, but he was best known by his nickname "Handicapped Thông" among local Chinese. He started out very poor, making a living by recycling garbage and other used material; later, he began to enter into other types of businesses, in which he earned his fortune. There used to be a life-size bronze statue of Thông Hiệp standing right in the center of the Bình Tây Market, surrounded by four bronze lions, and four bronze dragons spitting water into the fountain under in which the statue of Thông was standing. The full size statue of Thông was replaced with a smaller glass altar sometime between 1976 and 1980 for unknown reasons. Nowadays, that statue is located in the Fine Art Museum of Ho Chi Minh city. The four bronze lions and dragons are still standing as of 2007.
