= Bình Phú, Ho Chi Minh City =

Bình Phú Phường Bình Phú Phú Định
- Ward
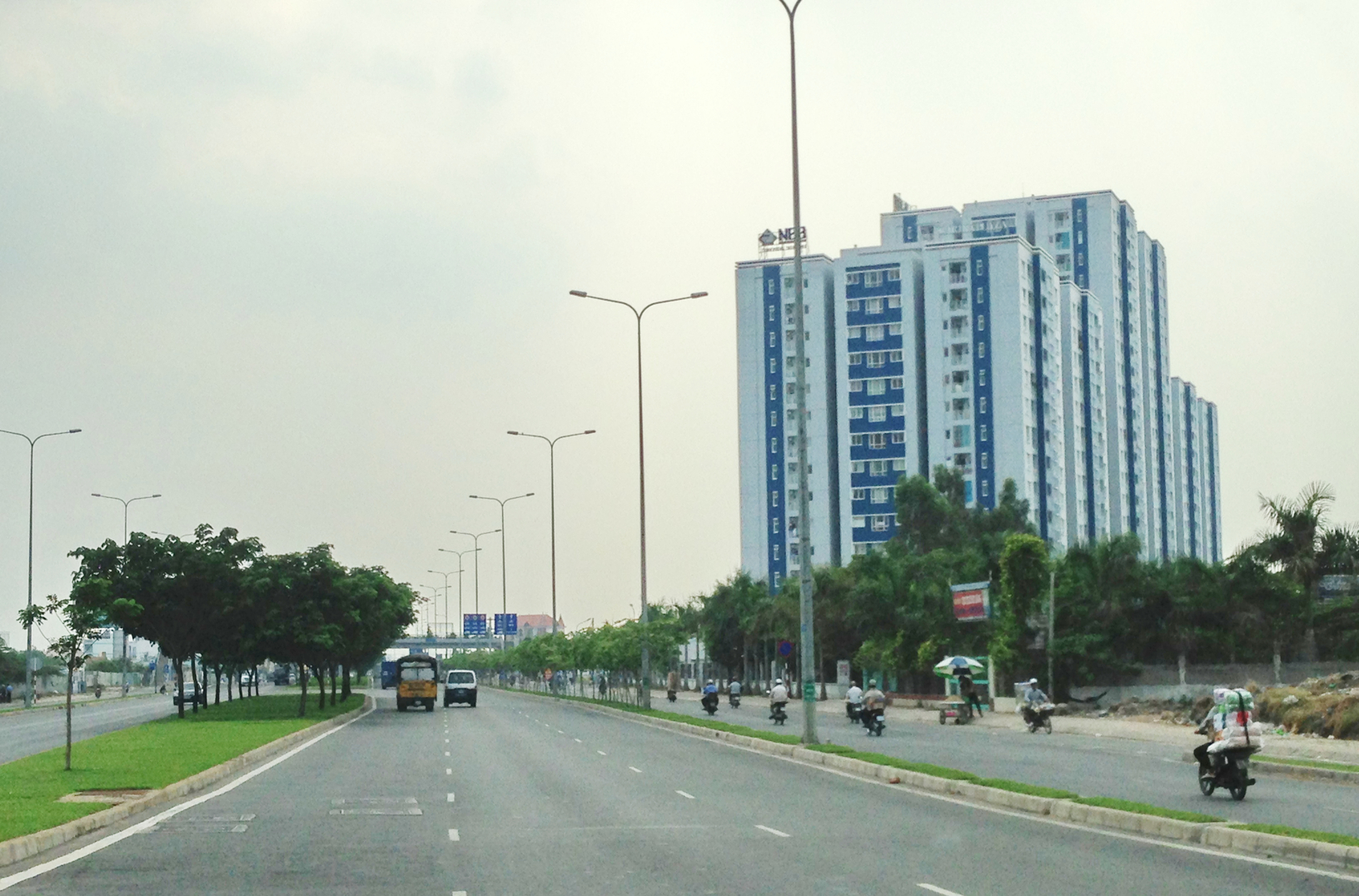
- Võ Văn Kiệt Boulevard in Bình Phú
- Interactive map of Bình Phú
- Coordinates: 10°44′14″N 106°37′34″E
- Country: Vietnam
- Municipality: Ho Chi Minh City
- Established: June 16, 2025

Area
  - Total: 1.10 sq mi (2.86 km^{2})

Population (2024)
  - Total: 75,925
  - Density: 68,800/sq mi (26,500/km^{2})
- Time zone: UTC+07:00 (Indochina Time)
- Administrative code: 26995

Bình Phú (Vietnamese: Phường Bình Phú) is a ward of Ho Chi Minh City, Vietnam. It is one of the 168 new wards, communes and special zones of the city following the reorganization in 2025.

== History ==
On June 16, 2025, the National Assembly Standing Committee issued Resolution No. 1685/NQ-UBTVQH15 on the arrangement of commune-level administrative units of Ho Chi Minh City in 2025 (effective from June 16, 2025). Accordingly, the entire land area and population of Ward 10, Ward 11 of the former District 6 and part of Ward 16 of the former District 8 will be integrated into a new ward named Bình Phú (Clause 16, Article 1).
