= Phú Lâm, Ho Chi Minh City =

Phú Lâm Phường Phú Lâm Tân Hòa Đông
- Ward
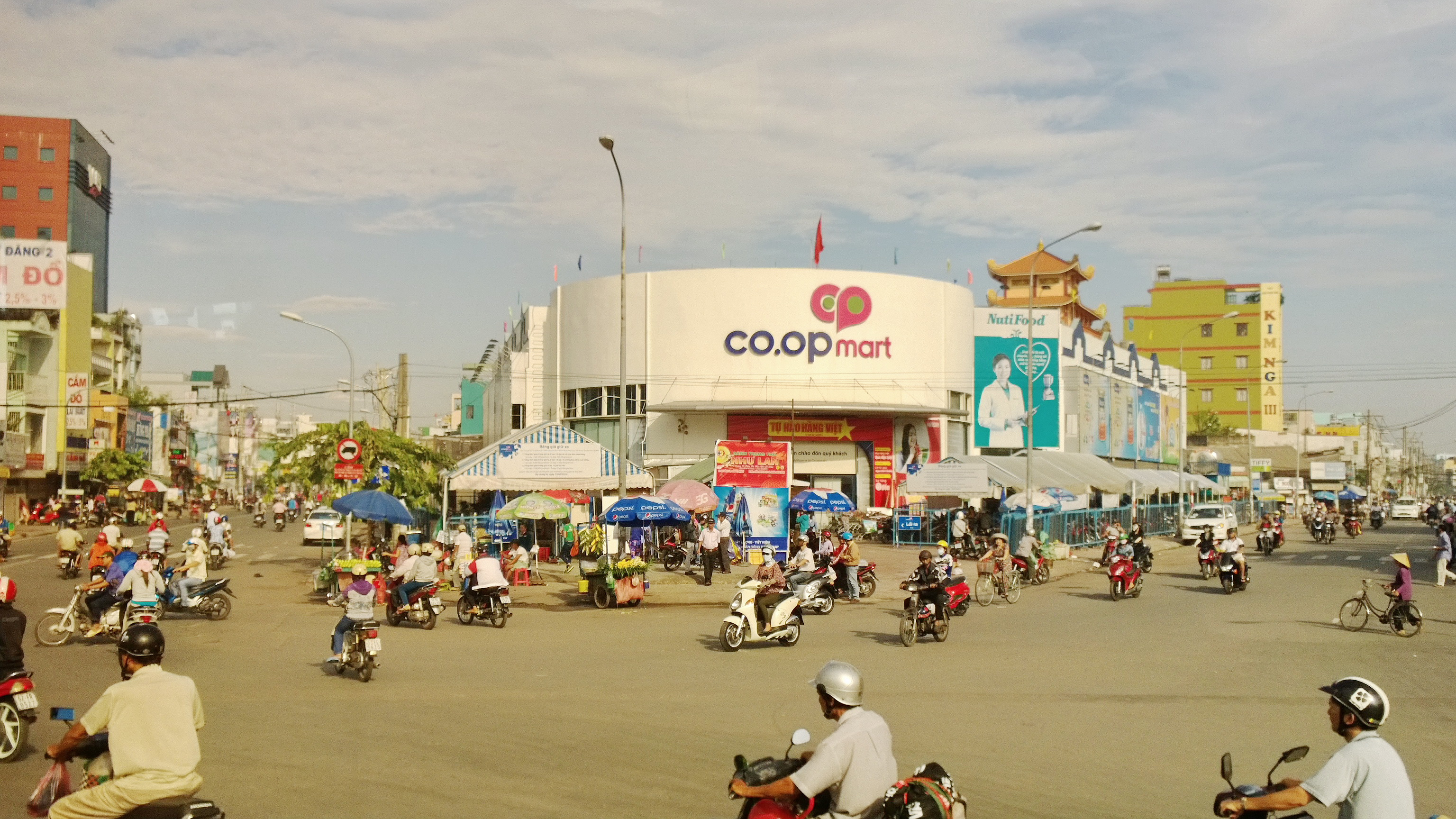
- A Coopmart in Phú Lâm
- Interactive map of Phú Lâm
- Coordinates: 10°45′09″N 106°37′57″E
- Country: Vietnam
- Municipality: Ho Chi Minh City
- Established: June 16, 2025

Area
  - Total: 0.77 sq mi (2.00 km^{2})

Population (2024)
  - Total: 87,513
  - Density: 113,000/sq mi (43,800/km^{2})
- Time zone: UTC+07:00 (Indochina Time)
- Administrative code: 27349

Phú Lâm (Vietnamese: Phường Phú Lâm) is a ward of Ho Chi Minh City, Vietnam. It is one of the 168 new wards, communes and special zones of the city following the reorganization in 2025.

== History ==
On June 16, 2025, the National Assembly Standing Committee issued Resolution No. 1685/NQ-UBTVQH15 on the arrangement of commune-level administrative units of Ho Chi Minh City in 2025 (effective from June 16, 2025). Accordingly, the entire land area and population of Ward 12, Ward 13 and Ward 14 of the former District 6 will be integrated into a new ward named Phú Lâm (Clause 17, Article 1).

== Administration ==
Phú Lâm is divided into 29 neighborhoods, numbered from 1 to 29.
