= Hoa people =

Han Chinese in Vietnam

Hoa people Chinese Vietnamese
Người Hoa 華僑 / 唐人
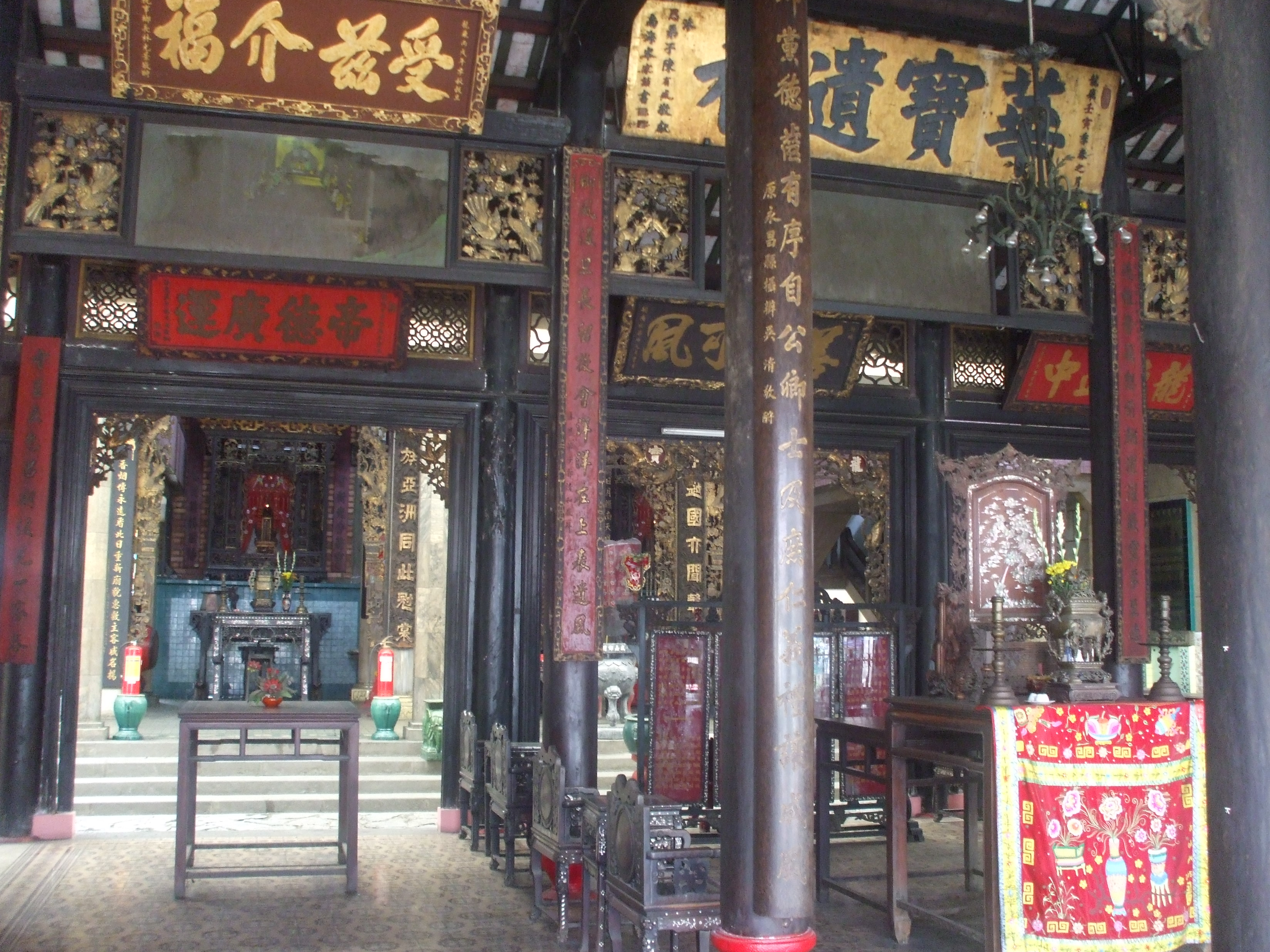
- Inside of Đình Minh Hương Gia Thạnh (明鄕嘉盛會館, "Ming Ancestry Assembly Hall"), a temple established in 1789 by Hoa people

Total population
- 749,466; 0.78% of the Vietnamese population (2019) (Note: Official figure of Vietnamese citizens with "Chinese Ancestry" stated in their ID, this includes those who have already been assimilated)

Regions with significant populations
- Ho Chi Minh City; Đồng Nai; Cần Thơ; An Giang; Cà Mau; Da Nang; Bắc Ninh; Quảng Ninh

Languages
- Primary languages: Cantonese (lingua franca); Vietnamese Mother-Tongue languages: Standard Chinese; Teochew; Hakka; Hokkien; Hainanese Diaspora languages: English; French

Religion
- A syncretic blend of: Mahayana Buddhism; Confucianism; Taoism Others: Catholicism; Protestantism; Folk religion

Related ethnic groups
- Hoa Nùng · Sán Dìu people · Ngái people Overseas Chinese

Hoa

Chinese name
- Traditional Chinese: 越南華僑
- Simplified Chinese: 越南华侨
- Literal meaning: Overseas Chinese
Transcriptions
Standard Mandarin
- Hanyu Pinyin: Yuè nán huá qiáo
Hakka
- Romanization: iad^{6} nam^{2} fa^{2} kiau^{2}
Yue: Cantonese
- Yale Romanization: Yuht nàahm Wàh kìuh
- Jyutping: jyut^{6} naam^{4} waa^{4} kiu^{4}
Southern Min
- Hokkien POJ: O̍at-lâm-Hôa-kiâu

Alternative Chinese name
- Traditional Chinese: 唐人
Transcriptions
Yue: Cantonese
- Yale Romanization: Tòhngyàhn
- Jyutping: Tong^{4} Jan^{4}

Vietnamese name
- Vietnamese alphabet: Người Hoa/dân tộc Hoa/Gốc Hoa; Dehumanising Insult/Derogatory term: người Tàu (Note: the derogatory term Tàu meaning "boat" may also be used as an adjective, placed after a noun to signify something Chinese, such as Chinese ink (mực tàu), jujube or Chinese dates (táo tàu) or Chinatown (phố tàu). This is used as an insult and is derived from Chinese refugees who fled Vietnam in boats)
- Chữ Nôm: 𠊛華 𠊛漢 𠊛艚

The Hoa people, also known as Chinese Vietnamese (Vietnamese: người Hoa, Chinese: 華人; pinyin: Huárén; Cantonese Yale: Wàhyàhn; or Chinese: 唐人; Jyutping: Tong4 jan4; Cantonese Yale: Tòhngyàhn), are an ethnic minority in Vietnam composed of citizens and nationals of full or partial Han Chinese ancestry. The term primarily refers to ethnic Chinese who migrated from southern Chinese provinces to Vietnam during the 18th century, although Chinese migration to the region dates back millennia. While millions of Vietnamese may trace distant Chinese ancestry due to centuries of migration during periods when Vietnam was under Chinese rule, the Hoa are defined by their continued identification with Chinese language, culture and community. They remain closely connected to broader Han Chinese identity when compared to their Kinh counterparts. "Chinese-Vietnamese" usually refers to these individuals, in contrast to those who have assimilated into Vietnamese society and are no longer regarded as culturally Chinese.

The Hoa have historically maintained a prominent role in Vietnam's commercial and urban life. Under French Indochina, colonial authorities often favoured the Hoa for their commercial acumen. From the late 19th century to the early 1970s, the Hoa dominated the private sector, with estimates attributing 70 to 80 percent(some industries) of pre-1975 Saigon's privately owned businesses to them. After 1975, the Communist Party of Vietnam (CPV) seized power and nationalised many Hoa businesses and properties for confiscation, regardless. Hoa individuals universally were accused of political disloyalty and collaboration with foreign powers. The situation worsened in the period preceding and throughout the Sino-Vietnamese War, prompting a mass exodus of Hoa as boat people fleeing persecution and anti-Chinese policies.

Vietnam's adoption of economic liberalisation from 1987 gradually allowed the Hoa to reestablish a presence in the business sector. Although their influence today is not as pronounced as before 1975, the Hoa remain a commercially resilient group within a diversified Vietnamese economy now open to foreign corporations and global competition.

== Classifications ==
Classification	Definition
Hoa	Refers to those who are fully southern Chinese by blood, specifically those who maintain cultural traditions and may or may not maintain community structures that differentiate them from completely assimilated individuals of Chinese ancestry (gốc Hoa).
Gốc Hoa	Also referred to as "Người Việt gốc Hoa", it refers to mixed (Note: Mixed in terms of nationality as well.) Vietnamese people who recognize their Chinese heritage, usually those who are assimilated. Considered an umbrella term for Hoa, but is ambiguously used by the Vietnamese government.
Hoa kiều	Refers to overseas Chinese Vietnamese. Also can be referred as "Việt Hoa Kiều" or "Hoa Kiều Việt Nam".

== History ==
=== Early history ===
Vietnam was governed by the early Chinese leniently and indirectly with no immediate change in indigenous policies.

Chinese presence was first felt in modern day Vietnam in 179 BC, when Âu Lạc was conquered by Nanyue. However, this was minimal due to Nanyue leaving indigenous chiefs mostly in control of the population.

In 111 BC, Han conquered Nanyue and continued the Nanyue policy of relinquishing control to indigenous chiefs for the next several hundred years. "Recognition" was often bestowed upon the local leaders as a symbol of legitimacy of rule and in return they paid tribute as a form of "tax". The first form of "Chinese Vietnamese" were newly settled Han Chinese officials. In fact, indigenous ways of life and ruling class did not experience major Sinitic impact, into the first century CE.

While enough immigrants existed to form a coherent Han-Viet ruling class, not enough existed to administratively or culturally dominate the indigenous society. Furthermore, throughout Han rule, Han imperial officials typically adopted local customs and intermarried in efforts to maintain the peace and stability. Due to this, sinicization did not happen.

A noteworthy Chinese Vietnamese of this time was one of the Giao Chỉ prefects, Shi Xie, who was a sixth generation Chinese Vietnamese (fully Han Chinese descent) and ruled Vietnam as an autonomous warlord for forty years. He was posthumously deified by later Vietnamese monarchs. In the words of Stephen O'Harrow, Shi Xie was essentially "the first Vietnamese." His rule gave "formal legitimacy" to those identifying with interests of the local society than with Chinese hegemony. And while the Chinese saw Shi Xie as "frontier guardian", the Vietnamese considered him the head of regional ruling-class society. According to Taylor (1983):

He was the first of many such people to emerge as strong regional leaders who nurtured the local society in the context of Chinese civilization.

Another noteworthy Chinese Vietnamese was Ly Bon who led a rebellion against the Liang, frustrated with the corruption in the government and hostility toward the local population. Ly Bon's ancestors were among the Chinese who fled south to escape the disorders of Wang Mang's usurpation, in the fifth century.

The Chinese of Vietnamese ancestry became assimilated, while still maintaining their Chinese identity, and were absorbed into the "social, economic and political environment" in Northern Vietnam. The insight, skills, customs, and ideas brought in by the Chinese rule and limited migration allowed the native to develop a sense of independence and identity. The strength of localization in ancient Vietnam has thus been widely noted.

The first truly Vietnamese Ngô dynasty deported some 87,000 Chinese, with a minority applying for permanent residency in Vietnam. The Chinese Vietnamese who remain in Vietnam ended up fully assimilated.

Those of mixed heritage, from previous Han-Vietnamese intermarriages, later became gentry and ruling class of Vietnam.

This generation of "Chinese Vietnamese" has long been assimilated into the modern day Vietnamese identity or vice versa. Vietnamese identity was heavily inspired by the Chinese customs and technology at this time.

=== After independence ===
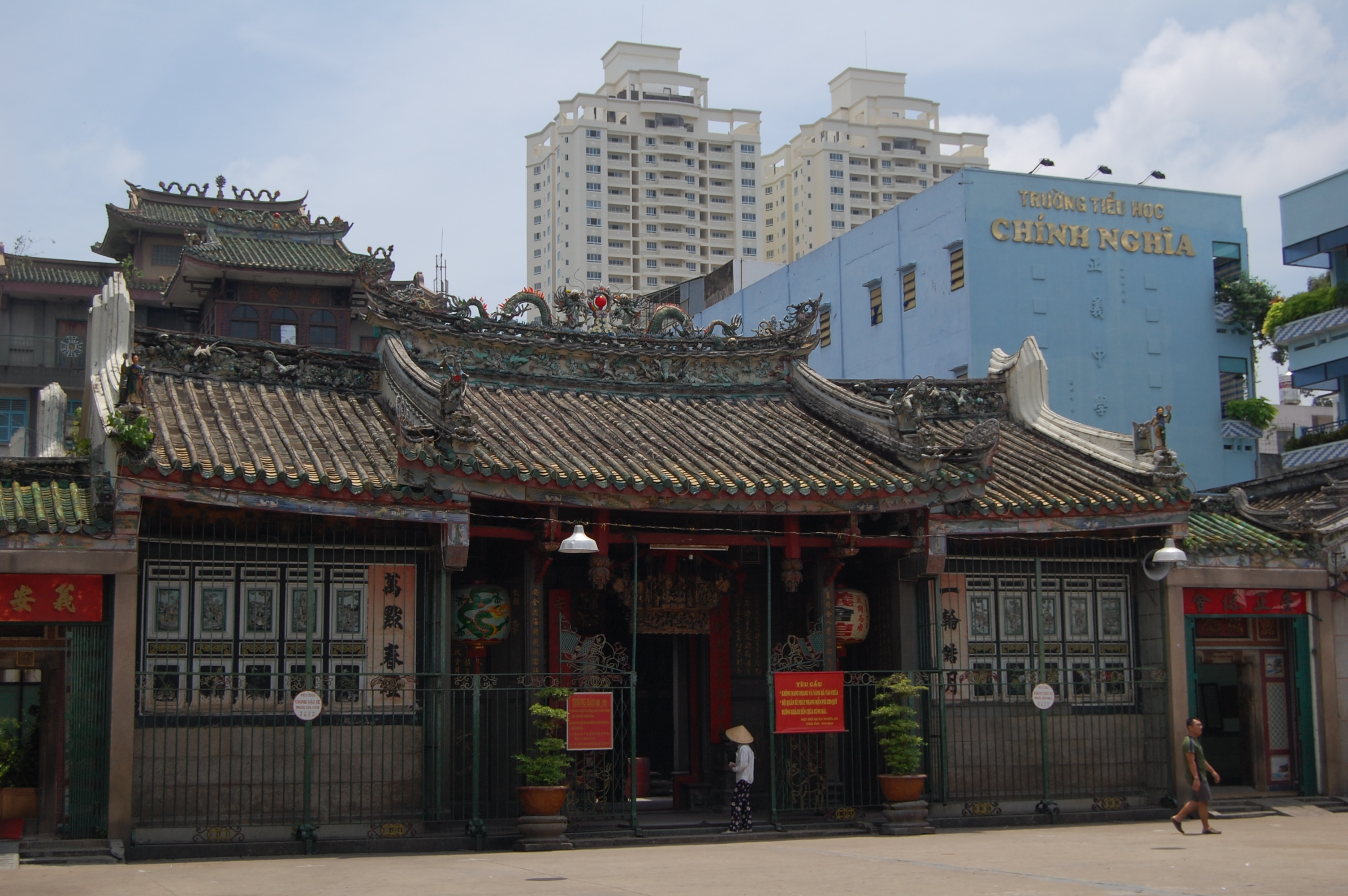
Hội Quán Nghĩa An, a Hakka and Teochew shared Community hall in Chợ Lớn.

Sporadic Chinese migration into Vietnam continued during the 9th–15th century AD. The Vietnamese court during the Lý and Trần dynasties welcomed Chinese scholars and officials to fill into its administrative and bureaucratic ranks. These ranged from Chinese refugees, consisting of civilian and military officials with their family members, seeking asylum from turmoil or opportunities. They were required to adopt and adhere to the customs of the administration.

==== The Chinese-Cham ====
In 1050, the Cham dedicated Chinese slaves to their goddess Lady Po Nagar at the Po Nagar temple complex, along with Thai, Khmer and Burmese slaves. It has been speculated by Professor Kenneth Hall that these slaves were war captives taken by the Cham from the port of Panduranga (modern day Phan Rang) after the Cham conquest and enslavement all inhabitants, including foreigners.

In modern day southern Vietnam, the Daoyi Zhilue mentioned Chinese merchants who frequented Champa and started families with Cham wives. One notable example of such intermarriages was Chinese merchant from Quanzhou, Wang Yuanmao, who in the 12th century traded extensively with Champa and married a Cham princess. Chinese prisoners were exchanged for captured districts in 1078 after China defeated Đại Việt and overran Cao Bằng. The descendants of these intermarriages, who took on a distinct "Chinese" identity, precedes the Vietnamization of modern day southern Vietnam.

==== Ly Dynasty ====
The founder of the Lý dynasty, Lý Thái Tổ, has been ascribed of having origins from Fujian Province in his paternal bloodline, but little is known about his maternal side except that his mother was named Phạm Thị. His Chinese ethnicity has been wildly accepted by Vietnamese historians like Trần Quốc Vượng. During the Min-Chinese led Lý dynasty, Vietnam had raided Song dynasty China and forcefully conscripted the captured. The distinct Chinese last names are found in the Tran and Ly dynasty Imperial examination records. Furthermore, the ethnicity are also recorded in Tran and Ly dynasty records of officials.

==== Tran Dynasty and the Song remnants in Vietnam ====
The fishing Min Chinese Tran family had usurped the Min Chinese Ly dynasty through marriage.

The ancestors of the Trần clan originated from the province of Fujian and had migrated under Trần Kinh (陳京; Tân Keng) to Đại Việt, where their descendants established the Trần dynasty which ruled Đại Việt. The descendants of the Trần clan who came to rule Đại Việt were of mixed-blooded(Unsure, Min-Chinese + Min-Chinese results in mixed?) descent due to many intermarriages between the Trần and several royal members of the Lý dynasty alongside members of their royal court as in the case of Trần Lý and Trần Thừa, the latter whose son Trần Thái Tông would later become the first emperor of the Trần dynasty. Their descendants established the Tran dynasty, which ruled Vietnam (Dai Viet). Some of the mixed-blooded(like-wise claim) descendants and certain members of the clan could still speak Chinese, as when a Yuan dynasty envoy met with the Chinese-speaking Tran Prince Trần Quốc Tuấn in 1282. The first of the Trần clan to live in Đại Việt was Trần Kinh, who settled in Tức Mặc village (now Mỹ Lộc, Nam Định) who lived by fishing.

Professor Liam Kelley noted that people from Song dynasty China like Zhao Zhong and Xu Zongdao fled to the Tran dynasty ruled Vietnam after the Mongol invasion of the Song. The Daoist cleric Xu Zongdao, who migrated from Fujian province to Vietnam, recorded the Mongol invasion and referred to them as "Northern bandits". He quoted the Đại Việt Sử Ký Toàn Thư which said "When the Song [Dynasty] was lost, its people came to us. Trần Nhật Duật, the king at that time, took them in. Zhao Zhong had even served as his personal guard. Therefore, among the accomplishments in defeating the Yuan [i.e., Mongols], Trần Nhật Duật's was outstanding".

Southern Song Chinese military officers and civilian officials left to overseas countries, went to Vietnam and intermarried with the Vietnamese ruling elite and went to Champa to serve the government there as recorded by Zheng Sixiao. Southern Song soldiers were part of the Vietnamese army prepared by emperor Trần Thánh Tông against the second Mongol invasion.

According to Vietnamese Folk-lore, Phạm Nhan (Nguyễn Bá Linh), born to a Yuan(Mongol Chinese) official/merchant and a women from Dong Trieu, is often portrayed as a villainous character or "evil god" for supporting the Mongols against the Vietnamese/Chinese.

The culture, clothing, food and language were all Chinese dominated in Van Don, where the Tran had migrated to from Fujian. The Min Chinese language would still be spoken by the Tran in Vietnam. The Red River Delta and along the coast of Vietnam, located to the capital's southeastern area, was home to numerous settlers, including the Tran, from Fujian and Guangdong. Van Don port was developed ad founded as a result of this interaction. This was in largely as a result of commerce and trade.

==== Ho Dynasty ====
China's province of Zhejiang around the 940s was the origin of the Chinese Hồ/Hú family from which Hồ dynasty founder Emperor Hồ Quý Ly came from.

=== 15th–18th centuries ===
==== Lê dynasty ====
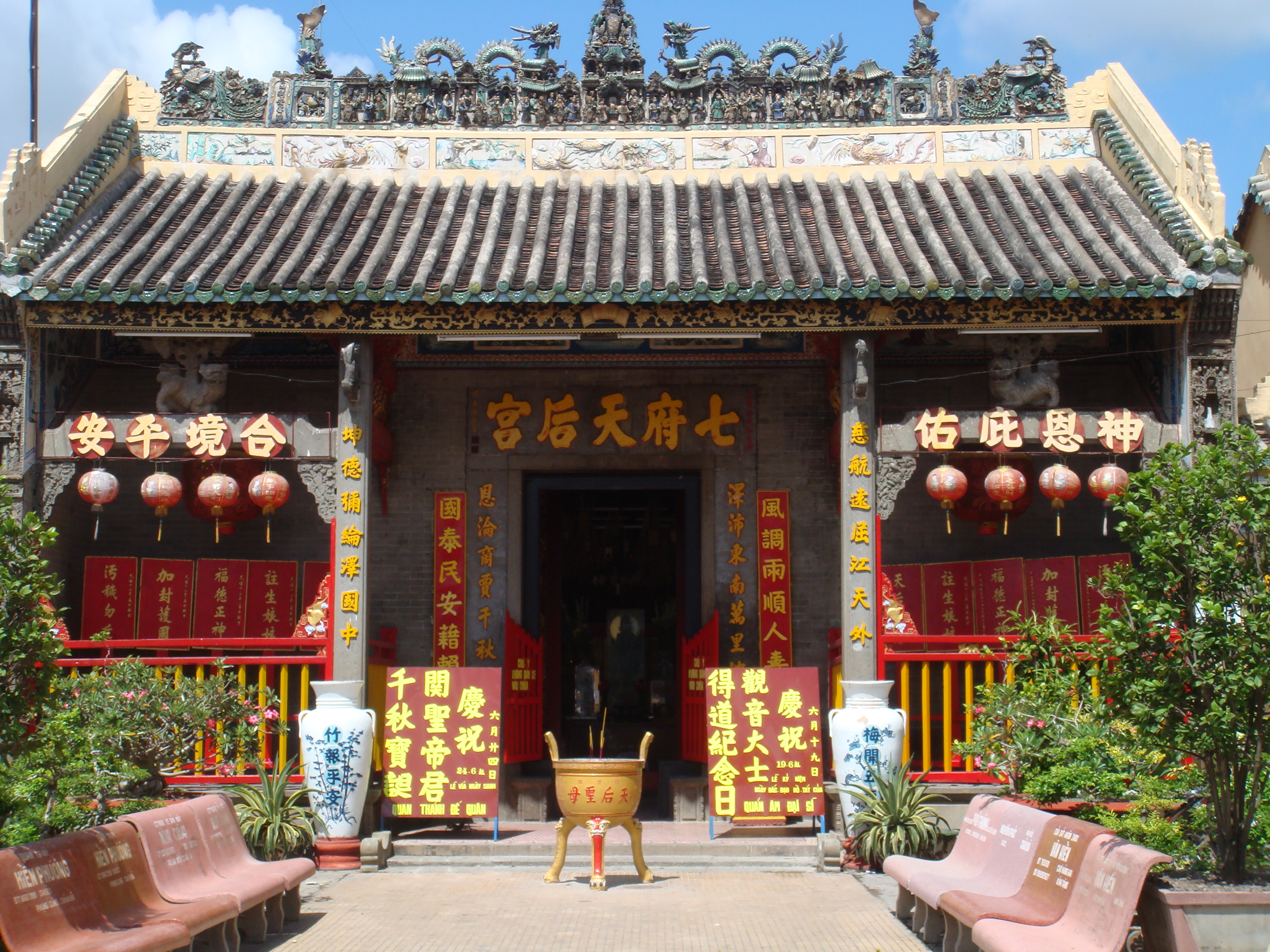
Thiên Hậu Temple of the Hoa community of Sa Đéc

After the Fourth Chinese domination of Vietnam it was recorded that the union of Vietnamese women and Chinese (Ngô) men produced offspring which were left behind in Vietnam and the Chams, Cẩu Hiểm, Laotians, and Vietnamese natives who collaborated with the Ming were enslaved by Le government in the Complete Annals of Đại Việt.

The return of the Ming Chinese to China was commanded by the Ming and not Lê Lợi. The Trai made up the supporters of Le Loi in his campaign. He lived among the Trai at the border regions as their leader and seized the Ming-ruled lowland Kinh areas after originally forming his base in the southern highland regions. The southern dwelling Trai and Red River dwelling Vietnamese were in effect locked in a "civil war" during the anti-Ming rebellion by Le Loi.

The leader Lưu Bác Công (Liu Bogong) in 1437 commanded a Dai Viet military squad made out of ethnic Chinese since even after the independence of Dai Viet, Chinese remained behind. Vietnam received Chinese defectors from Yunnan in the 1400s.

It is unknown whether the Chinese, captured and castrated by the Vietnamese, were involved in regular trade between China and Vietnam or were blown off course. They fell victim to the Vietnamese isolationist stance during the time.

in 1499, an entry in the Ming Shilu mentioned thirteen Chinese men from Wenchang, including a young man named Wu Rui, were captured by the Vietnamese after their ship was blown off course while traveling from Hainan to Qinzhou, in the 1460s, during the reign of Chenghua Emperor.

Twelve of them were enslaved to work as agricultural laborers, whilst the youngest Chinese man, Wu Rui was selected by the Vietnamese court for castration. Since he was the only young man in among the thirteen, he was made a eunuch of the Vietnamese imperial palace, Thang Long for almost one fourth of a century.

After years of servitude, in 1497 to a military position of importance, after the death of a ruler, in Northern Vietnam as military superintendent as recognition for his service and expertise by the Vietnamese. He was informed by a Lạng Sơn guard soldier, called Dương Tam Tri (楊三知), of an escape route back to China and Wu Rui attempted an escaped to Longzhou after 9 days of traversing mountains. Unfortunately, his escape attempt via Lạng Sơn eventually led to his capture by the Wei family (Tusi) in Guangxi, who initially detained him rather than returning him to the Ming court or back to Vietnam. Vietnam offered to buy Wu Rui back from Wei Chen for 100 Jin, afraid that Wu Rui would reveal Vietnamese state secrets to China. Wei Chen demanded more. However, before they could agree on a price, Wu was rescued by the Pingxiang magistrate Li Guangning and was sent to Beijing to work as a eunuch in the Ming palace at the Directorate of Ceremonial (司禮監太監).

The Đại Việt sử ký toàn thư records that in 1467 in An Bang province of Dai Viet (now Quảng Ninh Province) a Chinese ship blew off course onto the shore. The Chinese were detained and not allowed to return to China as ordered by Lê Thánh Tông. This incident may be the same one where Wu Rui was captured.

A 1472 entry in the Ming Shilu reported that some Chinese from Nanhai escaped back to China after their ship had been blown off course into Vietnam, where they had been forced to serve as soldiers in Vietnam's military. The escapees also reported that they found out that more than 100 Chinese men remained as captives in Vietnam after they were caught and castrated by the Vietnamese after their ships were blown off course into Vietnam in other incidents. The Chinese Ministry of Revenue responded by ordering Chinese civilians and soldiers to stop going abroad to foreign countries. These 100 men were taken prisoner around the same time as Wu Rui. Historian Leo K. Shin believes all of them may have been involved in illegal trade instead of being blown off course by wind. Both the incidents of the young Chinese man Wu Rui and the 100+ Chinese men ,castrated and turned into eunuchs, point to possible involvement in trade according to historians John K. Whitmore and Tana Li which was then suppressed by the Vietnamese government instead of them really being blown off course by the wind. China's relations with Vietnam during this period were marked by the punishment of prisoners by castration.

==== Northern and Southern dynasties (1533–1597) ====
The Chinese living in the Mekong Delta area settled there before any Vietnamese settled in the region. When the Ming dynasty fell, several thousand Chinese refugees fled south and extensively settled on Cham lands and in Cambodia. Most of these Chinese were young males and they took Cham women as wives. Their children started to identify more with Chinese culture. This migration occurred in the 17th and 18th centuries. In the 17th century many Chinese men from southeastern Chinese provinces like Fujian continued to move to southeast Asia, including Vietnam, many of the Chinese married native women after settling down in places like Hội An.

In the 16th century, Lê Anh Tông of the Lê dynasty encouraged traders to visit Vietnam by opening up Thăng Long (Hanoi), Huế and Hội An. Chinese presence in the Huế/Hội An area dated back as early as 1444, when a monk from Fujian built the Buddhist temple, Chua Chuc Thanh. Hội An quickly developed into a trading port from the 16th century onwards, when Chinese and Japanese traders began to arrive in the city in greater numbers. When an Italian Jesuit priest, Father Christofo Borri, visited the city in 1618, he aptly described the city as: "The city of Faifo is so vast that one would think it is two juxtaposed cities; a Chinese city and a Japanese city." The Japanese traders quickly disappeared by the first half of the 17th century as Tokugawa shogunate imposed a policy of self-isolation. In 1642, the Francisco Goraemon, a Japanese Christian, reported that Hội had a Japanese population of approximately 40–50 people, while the Chinese numbered some 5,000 individuals.

==== Nguyễn Lords (1533–1789) ====
Han Chinese Ming dynasty refugees numbering 3,000 came to Vietnam at the end of the Ming dynasty. They opposed the Qing dynasty and were fiercely loyal to the Ming dynasty. Vietnamese women married these Han Chinese refugees since most of them were soldiers and single men. Their descendants became known as Minh Hương and they strongly identified as Chinese despite influence from Vietnamese mothers. They did not wear Manchu hairstyle unlike later Chinese migrants to Vietnam during the Qing dynasty.

Hội An was also the first city to take on refugees from the Ming dynasty following the Manchu conquest. An association for these refugees, commonly referred to as "Ming-Huong-Xa" (明香社) first appeared between 1645 and 1653. Around this time, Hội An and Vietnamese territories further south were under the control of the Nguyễn lords and the Nguyễn rulers allowed Vietnamese refugees to freely settle in disputed frontier lands with remnants of the Champa kingdom and the Khmer empire. According to the Dai Nam Chronicle, a Chinese general from Guangxi, Yang Yandi (Dương Ngạn Địch) led a band of 3,000 Ming loyalists to Huế to seek asylum. The Ming loyalist Chinese pirate Yang Yandi and his fleet sailed to Vietnam to leave the Qing dynasty in March 1682, first appearing off the coast of Tonkin in North Vietnam. According to the Vietnamese account, Vũ Duy Chí (武惟志), a minister of the Vietnamese Lê dynasty came up with a plan to defeat the Chinese pirates by sending more than 300 Vietnamese girls who were beautiful singing girls and prostitutes with red handkerchiefs to go to the Chinese pirate junks on small boats. The Chinese pirates and Northern Vietnamese girls had sex but the Vietnamese women then wet the gun barrels of the Chinese pirates ships with their handkerchiefs which they got wet. They then left in the same boats. The Vietnamese navy then attacked the Chinese pirate fleet which was unable to fire back with their wet guns. The Chinese pirate fleet, originally 206 junks, was reduced to 50-80 junks by the time it reached south Vietnam's Quảng Nam and the Mekong delta. The Chinese pirates having sex with North Vietnamese women may also have transmitted a deadly epidemic from China to the Vietnamese which ravaged the Tonkin regime of North Vietnam. French and Chinese sources say a typhoon contributed to the loss of ships along with the disease.

The Nguyễn court allowed Duong and his surviving followers to resettle in Đồng Nai, which had been newly acquired from the Khmers. Duong's followers named their settlement as "Minh Huong", to recall their allegiance to the Ming dynasty. More Chinese refugees followed suit to settle in Hội An and the frontier territory in Cochinchina such as Mạc Cửu, who had earlier settled in the Kampot–Hà Tiên area in the 1680s under the patronage of the Cambodian king, Chey Chettha IV. However, Cambodia fell into Thai rule under Taksin and, in 1708, Mạc Cửu switched his alliance to the Nguyễn lords, paying tribute to Huế. Mạc Cửu was given autonomy to rule Ha Tien in return for his tribute and throughout the 18th century, his descendants implemented their own administrative policies, independent of Huế and Cambodia. The presence of these semi-autonomous fiefdoms run by Chinese refugees encouraged more Chinese to settle in the South. In contrast, very few Chinese refugees chose to settle in territories controlled by the Trịnh lords, who still mandated Chinese refugees to strictly follow Vietnamese customs and refrain from contacts with the local Vietnamese populace in the cities.

Vietnamese women were wedded as wives of the Han Chinese Minh Hương (明鄉) who moved to Vietnam during the Ming dynasty's fall. They formed a new group of people in Vietnamese society and worked for the Nguyễn government. Both Khmer and Vietnamese wedded the Chinese men of the Minh Hương. Ha Tien came under the control of Mo Jiu (Ma Cuu), a Chinese who was among the Mekong Delta Ming migrants. Lang Cau, Cam Pho, Chiem, and Cu Lao in Hoi An were the sites of settlement by Minh Huong who were the result of native women becoming wives of Fujianese Chinese. The Minh Hương community descended from Vietnamese wedding youthful Chinese men in Cochinchina and Hoi An in Nguyễn lands. This new migration established a distinct Chinese diaspora group in Vietnam which was unlike in ancient times when the Vietnamese upper class absorbed ethnic Chinese who had come. Minh Hương were ethnically hybrid Chinese and Vietnamese descended from Chinese men and Vietnamese women. They lived in rural areas and urban areas. Chinese citizens in Vietnam were grouped as Huaqiao by the French while the Minh Huong were permanent residents of Vietnam who were ethnic Chinese. To make commerce easier, Vietnamese female merchants wedded Chinese male merchants wedded in Hoi An. Trần Thượng Xuyên and Yang Yandi (Dương Ngạn Địch) were two Chinese leaders who in 1679 brought Minh Hương to South Vietnam to live under the Nguyễn lords.

Chinese trade and immigration began to increase towards the earlier half of the 18th century as population and economic pressures encouraged more Chinese men to seek trade opportunities in Southeast Asia, including Vietnam. It was around this time that the descendants of the Ming Chinese refugees–often referred to as Ming Huong Chinese–begin to foster a separate ethnocultural identity for the newer Chinese immigrants, whom they refer to as "Thanh nhân" (清人), or Qing people. The Thanh Nhan form independent Chinese associations along the same dialect group or clans in cities and towns where large populations prevail, including Cholon, Hội An and some towns in the Mekong Delta. The Minh Huong Chinese also formed similar associations, and notable examples include the Đình Minh Hương Gia Thạnh in Cholon, and the Dinh Tien Hien Lang Minh Huong in Hội An. Both groups of Chinese were also very active in the interior affairs of Vietnamese society; notable Minh Huong Chinese such as Trinh Hoai Duc and Ngo Nhan Tinh who became ministers under the Nguyễn court during Gia Long's reign. Many Thanh Nhan Chinese also participated as ragtag militia during the Tây Sơn rebellion, although their loyalties were divided based on their location of residence. The Thanh Nhan Chinese in Gia Định and Biên Hòa sided with Gia Long, whereas some Chinese in the Mekong Delta regions sided with the Khmers until the late 1790s.

The Nguyễn Lords of Vietnam had shipwrecked Chinese sailors who were blown towards Vietnam by the wind escorted safely back to China either on Vietnamese trading ships to Guangdong or from over the land border from Vietnam's Lạng Sơn province into China's Guangxi province through Zhennan Pass, where tribute envoys from Vietnam went to China. Quảng Nam Province was the site where fourth rank Chinese Brigade Vice-Commander (Dushu) Liu Sifu was shipwrecked after being blown by the wind and he was taken back to Guangzhou, China by a Vietnamese Nguyễn ship in 1669. The Vietnamese sent the Chinese Zhao Wenbin to led the diplomatic delegation on the ship and requested establishment of commercial links but the request was rejected despite Qing Chinese officials thanking the Nguyễn for repatriating the shipwrecked military officer. On Champa's coastal waters in a place called Linlangqian by the Chinese a ship ran aground after departing on 25 Jun 1682 from Cambodia carrying Chinese captain Chang Xiaoguan with a Chinese crew. Their cargo was left in the waters Chen Xiaoguan went to Thailand (Siam). This was recorded in the log of a Chinese trading junk going to Nagasaki on 25 June 1683.

A shipwrecked Chinese blown to Vietnam by the wind, Pan Dinggui in his book "Annan ji you" said that the Trinh restored the Le dynasty to power after Vietnam was struck by disease, thunder and winds when the Le was dethroned when they initially could not find Le and Tran dynasty royals to restore to the throne when he was in Vietnam in 1688. Pan also said that only the Le king was met by official diplomats from the Qing, not the Trinh lord.

=== 19th–20th centuries ===
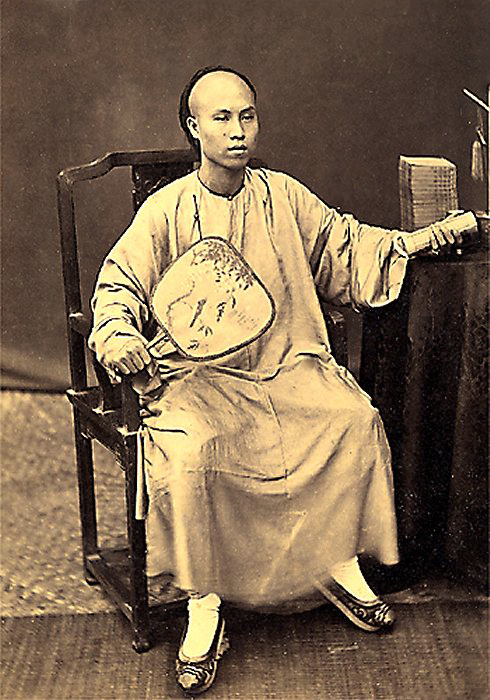
Hoa merchant in Hanoi (1885, photography by Charles-Édouard Hocquard)

The Thanh Nhan Chinese made their living by exporting rice to other Southeast Asian countries, and their participation increased greatly in the years during the early 18th century after the Tây Sơn rebellion. Under local laws, rice exports to other countries were tightly regulated, but the Chinese largely ignored this rule and exported rice en masse. The prices of rice witnessed an increase of 50–100% in the 1820s as a result of these exports, which irked the Nguyễn court under Emperor Minh Mạng. Minh Mạng's mandarin, Lê Văn Duyệt noticed that the Chinese had a great autonomy over trade affairs in Gia Dinh, which was partly attributed to the patronage of Trinh Hoai Duc who was serving as the governor of the province. Minh Mạng introduced a new series of measures to curb Chinese trade from 1831 onwards, and started by introducing new restrictions to which residents are banned from overseas travel, which culminated in a brief revolt among Gia Dinh's residents in 1833. The Nguyễn court also experimented with measures to assimilate the Chinese immigrants; in 1839 an edict was issued to abolish the Chinese clan associations in Vietnamese-ruled Cambodia, which proved to be ineffective. Minh Mạng's son, Thiệu Trị, introduced a new law to allow only Chinese-born immigrants to register with the Chinese clan associations, whereas their local-born male descendants are allowed to register with the Minh-Huong-xa and adorn the Vietnamese costume. The Nguyễn court also showed signs of subtle discrimination against people of Chinese origin; only one Minh Huong Chinese was promoted to a Mandarin. This sharply contrasted with the high representation of people of Chinese descent who were able to serve the Nguyễn court under Gia Long's reign.

Chinese immigration into Vietnam visibly increased following the French colonization of Vietnam from 1860 onwards following the signing of the Convention of Peking whereby the rights of Chinese to seek employment overseas were officially recognized by the Chinese, British and French authorities. Unlike their Vietnamese predecessors, the French were very receptive of these Chinese immigrants as it provided an opportunity to stimulate trade and industry, and they generally found employment as laborers or middlemen. The French established a special Immigration Bureau in 1874 requiring Chinese immigrants to register with the Chinese clan and dialect group associations and eased trade restrictions that were previously in place. Historians such as Khanh Tran viewed this as a divide-and-conquer policy, and its implementation intended to minimize the chances of any Vietnamese revolt against the French authorities. The Chinese population witnessed an exponential increase in the late 19th century and more so in the 20th century; between the 1870s and 1890s, some 20,000 Chinese settled in Cochinchina. Another 600,000 arrived in the 1920s and 1930s, and peaks in the migration patterns were especially pronounced during the 1920s and late 1940s when the effects of fighting and economic instability arising from the Chinese Civil War became pronounced.

The inter-ethnic marriage between Chinese and Vietnamese brought Chinese customs into Vietnam society. For example, crocodiles were eaten by Vietnamese while they were taboo and off-limits for Chinese. Vietnamese women who married Chinese men adopted the Chinese taboo.

Vietnamese women were wedded to the Chinese who helped sell Viet Minh rice.

=== Statehood under North Vietnam and South Vietnam: 1950–1975 ===
At a party plenum in 1930, the Indochinese Communist Party made a statement that the Chinese were to be treated on an equal footing with the Vietnamese, specifically defining them as "The workers and laborers among the Chinese nationals are allies of the Vietnamese revolution". One year after the state of North Vietnam was established, a mutual agreement was made between the Chinese Communist Party and Communist Party of Vietnam to give ethnic Chinese living in North Vietnam Vietnamese citizenship. This process was mostly completed by the end of the 1950s.

During the Vietnam War, the relationships were still cordial toward the Chinese minority in North Vietnam. Although the authorities increasingly encouraged the Chinese to get citizenship and reduced Chinese to a foreign language. Along the line of gradual assimilation, the prominent Chinese politician Zhou Enlai, during a visit to Hanoi in 1956, encouraged the Chinese to integrate into the Vietnamese society. Unlike in the South, the authorities never forced or punished the local Chinese for their culture.

"The Hoa in the north had all the rights and privileges of Vietnamese citizenship and none of its disadvantages. From about 1970 the Vietnamese had been trying to get us to become citizens, but few of us regarded it to be in our best interests. We could even vote in their elections. We were regarded as Vietnamese in all respects, except that we were not subject to the military draft."

Following the Battle of the Paracel Islands (a Chinese action that Hanoi disapproved), the DRV authorities started to hinder the Hoa in visiting their relatives in the PRC. Around the same time in South Vietnam, President Ngô Đình Diệm issued a series of measures between 1955 and 1956 to integrate the ethnic Chinese into South Vietnamese society:

- 7 December 1955: A nationality law was passed which automatically qualified Vietnamese residents of mixed Chinese and Vietnamese parentage as South Vietnamese citizens.
- 21 August 1956: Decree 48 was passed which made all ethnic Chinese born in Vietnam South Vietnamese citizens, irrespective of their family wishes. First-generation immigrants who were born in China, however, were not allowed to apply for Vietnamese citizenship and had to apply for residential permits that were to be renewed periodically, on top of paying residential taxes.
- 29 August 1956: Decree 52 was passed which required all Vietnamese citizens regardless of their ethnic origin to adopt a Vietnamese name within six months, failing which they had to pay a heavy fine.
- 6 September 1956: Decree 53 was issued which prohibited all foreigners from engaging in eleven different trades, all of which were dominated by ethnic Chinese. The foreign shareholders were required to liquidate their business or transfer their ownership to Vietnamese citizens within 6 months to 1 year, and failure to do so would result in deportation or a fine of up to 5 million piastres.

As most ethnic Chinese in Vietnam were Taiwanese in 1955, the measures greatly reduced the number of expatriate Chinese in South Vietnam. The fourth decree in particular had the effect of encouraging Chinese businessmen to transfer their assets to their local-born children. In 1955, the number of ROC nationals stood at 621,000, which was greatly reduced to 3,000 by 1958. The South Vietnamese government later relaxed its stance to foreign-born Chinese in 1963, and a new nationality law was passed to allow them the choice to retain their ROC nationality or adopt South Vietnamese citizenship. The following year, the Statistics Office created a new census category, "Nguoi Viet goc Hoa" (Vietnamese people of Chinese origin), whereby Vietnamese citizens of Chinese heritage were identified as such in all official documents. No further major measures were implemented to integrate or assimilate the Chinese after 1964.

Both Taiwan and the PRC protested the policies. Some Chinese wanted to leave Vietnam, but only a few went to Taiwan because the two governments couldn’t agree on the process. The protests of the two Chinese states did not have any effect on the policies of the Republic of Vietnam towards its Chinese community. Instead it was the actions of the Chinese population that forced the Vietnamese authorities to back down and to change the decrees

=== Departure from Vietnam: 1975–1990 ===
Following the reunification of Vietnam, The ethnic Hoa in South Vietnam suffered from the socialist transformation. A major challenge for the government was how to regulate and control sensitive market activity, especially in Ho Chi Minh City, where Chinese-owned businesses dominated much of the commercial economy. Following Vietnam's break with China in 1978, some Vietnamese leaders evidently feared the potential for espionage activities within the Chinese business community. On the one hand, Chinese-owned concerns controlled trade in a number of goods and services, such as pharmaceuticals, fertilizer distribution, grain milling, and foreign-currency exchange, that were supposed to be state monopolies. On the other hand, savvy Chinese entrepreneurs provided excellent access to markets for Vietnamese exports through Hong Kong and Singapore. This access became increasingly important in the 1980s as a way of circumventing the boycott on trade with Vietnam imposed by a number of Asian and Western Nations. An announcement on 24 March outlawed all wholesale trade and large business activities, which forced around 30,000 businesses to close down overnight, followed up by another that banned all private trade. Further government policies forced former owners to become farmers in the NEZ or join the armed forces and fight at the Vietnam-Cambodia border and confiscated all old and foreign currencies, as well as any Vietnamese currency in excess of the US value of $250 for urban households and $150 by rural households.

While such measures targeted all bourgeois elements, such measures hurt the Hoa the hardest and resulted in the expropriation of Hoa properties in and around major cities. Hoa communities offered widespread resistance and clashes left the streets of Cholon "full of corpses". These measures, combined with external tensions stemming from Vietnam's dispute with Cambodia and China in 1978 and 1979 caused an exodus of the majority of the Hoa, of whom more than 170,000 fled overland into the province of Guangxi, China, from the North and the remainder fled by boat from the South. China received a daily influx of 4–5,000 refugees, while Southeast Asian countries saw a wave of 5,000 boat people arriving at their shores each month. China sent unarmed ships to help evacuate the refugees but encountered diplomatic problems as the Vietnamese government denied that the Hoa suffered persecution and later refused to issue exit permits after as many as 250,000 Hoa had applied for repatriation. In an attempt to stem the refugee flow, avert Vietnamese accusations that Beijing was coercing its citizens to emigrate, and encourage Vietnam to change its policies towards ethnic Hoa, China closed off its land border in 1978. This led to a jump in the number of boat people, with as many as 100,000 arriving in other countries by the end of 1978. However, the Vietnamese government by now not only encouraged the exodus but took the opportunity to profit from it by extorting a price of five to ten taels of gold or an equivalent of US$1,500 to $3,000 per person wishing to leave the country. The Vietnamese military also forcibly drove the thousands of border refugees across the China-Vietnam land border, causing numerous border incidents and armed clashes, while blaming these movements on China by accusing them of using saboteurs to force Vietnamese citizens into China. This new influx brought the number of refugees in China to around 200,000. One family was split. An ethnic Chinese man was deported while his ethnic Vietnamese wife and child were left behind. For those who lacked the resources to pay their way out remained to face continued discrimination and ostracism, including forced retirement, reduction of food rations and exclusion from certain fields of study, a measure considered necessary for national security.

Quảng Ninh was the worst affected province. Some 160k Hoa were forced to leave, corresponding to approximately 22 per cent of the total population. The Chinese provided much-needed manpower to the industrial and mining sectors and the economy of the province was devastated by the departure of virtually the entire Chinese community.

The size of the exodus increased during and after the war. The monthly number of boat people arriving in Southeast Asia increased to 11,000 during the first quarter of 1979, 28,000 by April, and 55,000 in June, while more than 90,000 fled by boat to China. In addition, the Vietnamese military also began expelling ethnic Hoa from Vietnamese-occupied Cambodia, leading to over 43,000 refugees of mostly Hoa descent fleeing overland to Thailand. By now, Vietnam was openly confiscating the properties and extorting money from fleeing refugees. In April 1979 alone, Hoa outside of Vietnam had remitted a total of US$242 million (an amount equivalent to half the total value of Vietnam's 1978 exports) through Hong Kong to Ho Chi Minh City to help their friends or family pay their way out of Vietnam. By June, money from refugees had replaced the coal industry as Vietnam's largest source of foreign exchange and was expected to reach as much as 3 billion in US dollars. By 1980, the refugee population in China reached 260,000, and the number of surviving boat people refugees in Southeast Asia reached 400,000. (An estimated 50% to 70% of Vietnamese and Chinese boat people perished at sea.)

=== Đổi Mới (since 1986) ===
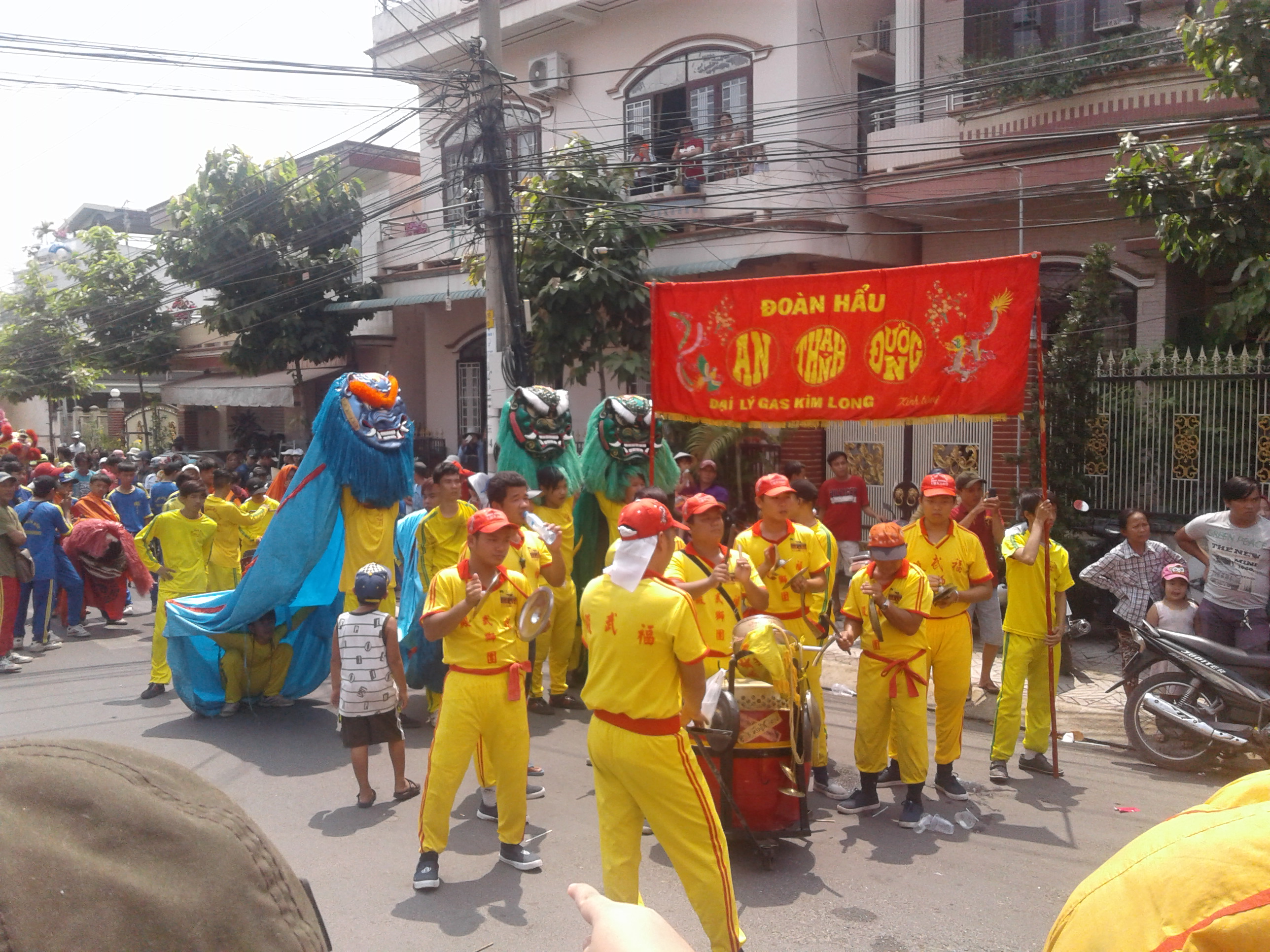
Lion dance in Ông Bổn Temple festival of Hoa people

After Nguyễn Văn Linh initiated the Vietnamese economic reforms in 1986, the Hoa in Vietnam has witnessed a massive commercial resurgence and despite many years of persecution began to regain much of their power in the Vietnamese economy. The open-door policy and economic reforms of Vietnam, as well as the improved economic and diplomatic relations of Vietnam with other Southeast Asian countries, has revived much of the entrepreneurial presence and economic clout of the predominantly urban Hoa minority in the roles they had played in the Vietnamese economy prior to 1975.

== Trade and industry ==
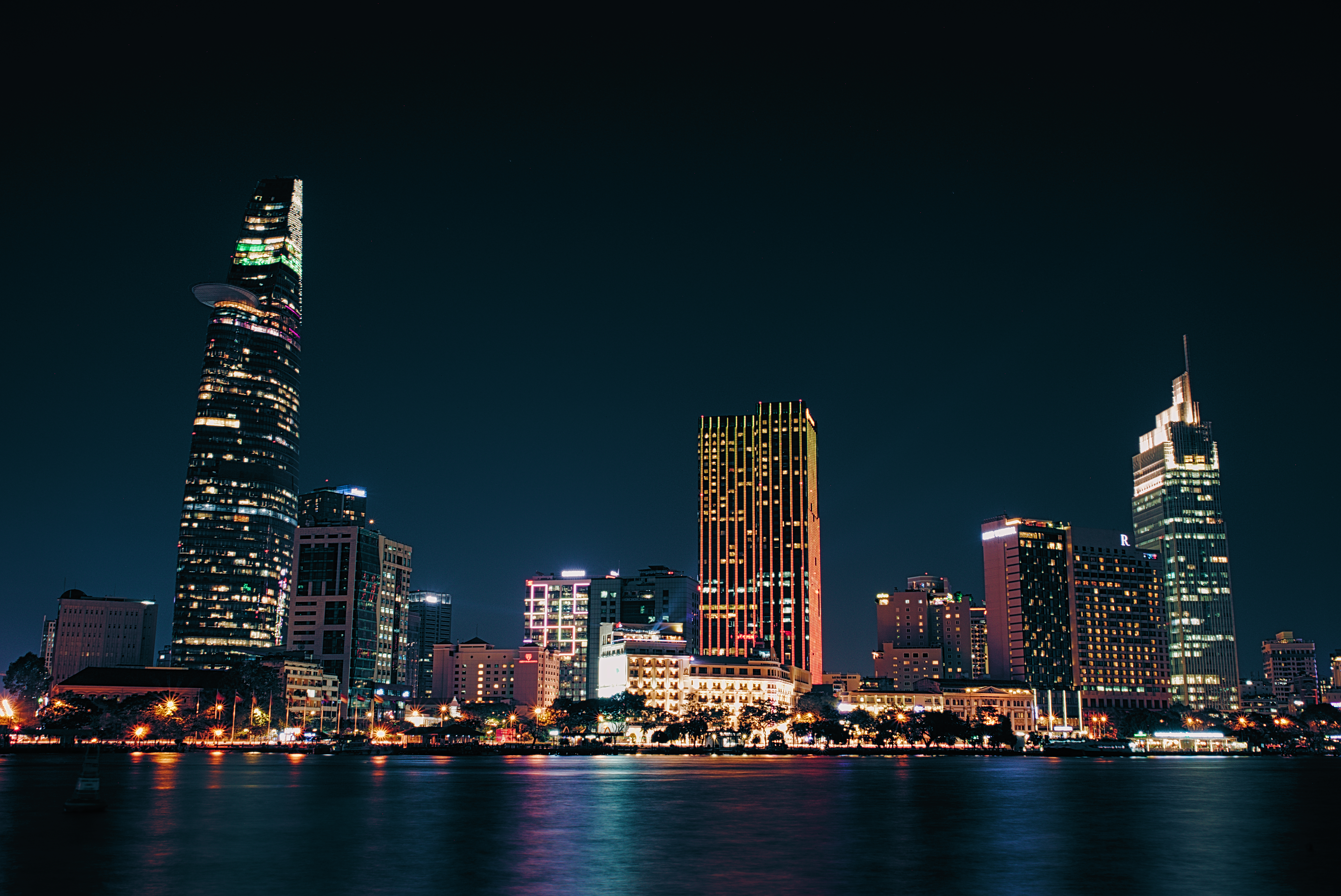
Ho Chi Minh City continues to be Vietnam's major financial district and business networking hub for Hoa businessmen and investors. The city is now home to thousands Chinese-owned businesses.(Note: This estimate includes mainland chinese investments, different from the local Hoa chinese)

Like much of Southeast Asia, the Hoa Had historically dominated parts of the Vietnamese commerce and industry at every level of society, ranging from the trade centers of Chợ Lớn, gold stores all the way to the enterprising rice merchants and humble shopkeepers dwelling along the rural hinterlands of the Mekong Delta. They have maintained a considerable presence in Vietnam's economy having been an affluent market-centered cultural minority for centuries, historically controlling parts of the country's most lucrative commercial, trade, and industrial sectors as a result of their financial acumen. The Hoa historically played a critical role in building, maintaining Vietnam's economic vitality and prosperity prior to having their properties confiscated and businesses nationalised by the Vietnamese Communists after 1975. In the past few decades before 1975, during the Vietnamese civilwar, the small Hoa minority had controlled as much as 70%(peak estimate for some industries like textiles and processed foods) of parts of the entire South Vietnamese economy and had accumulated significant commercial wealth. Having been reduced to nothing after 1975 with the significant exodus from the anti-Chinese policies, the Hoa has somewhat benefited, along side other ethnic minorities in Vietnam and the majority Kinh, from the results of the country's post-1988 Doi Moi economic liberalization reforms.

=== Early history and French colonial rule (3rd century BC–1945 AD) ===
The Hoa have played a prominent role in Vietnamese business and industry for over two millennia as the presence of Chinese economic dominance in Vietnam dates back to 208 B.C.. When the renegade Qin Chinese military general Zhao Tuo defeated An Dương Vương, the king of Âu Lạc in north Vietnam, and successfully conquered the Âu Lạc Kingdom, an ancient state situated in the northern mountains of modern Vietnam inhabited by the Lạc Việt and Âu Việt conglomeration of upland tribal peoples. Zhao annexed Âu Lạc into the Qin Empire the following year and declared himself the emperor of Nam Viet. A century later, a militarily powerful Han dynasty annexed Nanyue (which in Chinese translates to "land of the southern barbarians") into the Han Empire with Nanyue being ruled as a Chinese province for the next several centuries. Sinification of Nanyue was brought about by a combination of Han imperial military power, regular Han settlement, and an influx of Han Chinese refugees, officers and garrisons, merchants, scholars, bureaucrats, fugitives, convicts, and prisoners of war. By the end of the 17th century, a distinct Han Chinese community, known as the Hoa, had formed within Vietnamese society. Hoa enclaves and small Chinatowns took root in every major Vietnamese city and trading center as large congregations of newly minted Han Chinese immigrants coupled with their economic power allowed the establishment of various Hoa-based community organizations and institutions to regulate their commercial business activities as well as to look out, promote, and safeguard their economic interests. Modern Han Chinese settlement and immigration in Vietnam arose from the presentation of conducive opportunities for trade, investment, and business upon their visits to Hội An from the 16th century onward who initially traded black incense, silk, alum, and traditional Chinese medicinal products with the indigenous Kinh populace. Dutch, Portuguese, and French merchants who visited Hội An later in the 17th century introduced high-quality European-made brass utensils into the Vietnamese commercial trading market that invariably attracted the attention of the Hoa merchants. In turn, other Hoa businessmen ventured into the production of various goods such as porcelain, silver bars, in addition to a vast array of metals were traded on the open domestic Vietnamese commodity marketplace. Around this time, the Hoa began to establish their own private trading federations and social associations, the latter of which is referred to as a huiguan (会馆) or bang (帮) in Vietnamese or what the French colonialists denoted as congrégations to look out for, promote, and safeguard their own economic interests in addition to supporting the Hoa business community at large. The bang also mediated business disputes between members, allocated zones of economic influence for various industry leaders, provided business assistance and credit for up-and-coming and established Hoa entrepreneurs, in addition to adducing various welfare services, private education, and health care for newly settled Chinese immigrants, including the ready access to critical financial services provisions such as the collection of taxes and lending. As more Han Chinese immigrants poured into Vietnam by the 19th century, many of these Han immigrants found instantaneous assistance, affinity, camaraderie, and solidarity from their fellow Hoa brethren while developing an intimate chemistry to connect with the Hoa community at large as the bang not only served as meeting points not only for newly-settled immigrants to coalesce but also for fellow Hoa entrepreneurs to address their business concerns and solve together cooperatively. In addition, the bang also acted as nodes for Hoa community leaders and up-and-coming entrepreneurs to band together along ethnic and ancestral lines to pool seed capital to establish and expand their own or existing businesses, exchange information, sign contracts, as well as to develop and foster business contacts. At their disposal within the bang housed guilds and business cooperatives that enabled the Hoa to conduct their commercial business undertakings more efficiently and fluidly with the flow of higher quality market information, protect trade secrets, enforce business agreements, and greater levels of social trust and entrepreneurial cooperation. In addition, Hoa entrepreneurs also established Overseas Chinese business contacts, adduced reasonable bargains and struck deals to entice and maintain customer satisfaction, as well as relentlessly putting in extra hours by conscientiously working harder on a regular basis to gain a competitive business edge over their French and Kinh counterparts. A mild business temperament, astute business-making decisions, coupled with a preference for earning small profit gains by delaying instant self-gratification over a long period of time rather than to make a quick buck in the short term were also major factors that allowed the Hoa to prevail economically in Vietnam.

The Hoa were notoriously enterprising entrepreneurs that traded and manufactured a myriad of goods and services of value ranging from fine Chinese silk to black incense. The monopolized gold export trade was entirely under the hands of the Hoa in addition to their predominance of the local trade in paper, tea, pepper, arms, sulfur, lead, and lead oxide. Throughout the topography of Hoa economic life, different Hoa sub-ethnic groups monopolized various industry sectors. The Hakka predominated the traditional Chinese medicinal clinic trade, the Cantonese became grocers, with the Hainanese having flourished in the management of restaurant chains, while the Hokkien monopolized hardware merchandising, and the Teochew having taken over the rice trade. The economic clout wielded by the Hoa coupled with repeated military incursions and other invasive attempts by successive Chinese dynasties to conquer and dominate Vietnam inflamed anti-Chinese sentiment, hostility, bitterness, envy, insecurity, and resentment from their Kinh counterparts. Nonetheless, Chinese economic dominance continued to surge in an unswerving manner following the establishment of the Nguyễn dynasty in 1802. Since the commercial purpose from the business activities overseen by wealthy Hoa merchants and investors functioned as an important source of tax revenue and the political interests of the Nguyen mandarin officials. By the time the French arrived in the mid-18th century, the Hoa commercially dominated the Kinh majority in trade, mining, and every urban market sector in addition to prospering under the colonial laissez-faire market policies enshrined by the French colonialists.

During the epoch of French administration, the Hoa assumed a dominant position in Vietnam's rice processing, marketing, transportation, meat slaughtering, and grocery outlets. The French colonial era also saw a marked increase in the Hoa population as a result of French policies in Vietnam. Prior to the arrival of the French, trade both foreign and domestic was dominated by the Chinese. The French government made the decision to elevate the role of the Chinese in commerce and to bring in Chinese labor to assist in the development of infrastructure such as roads, railroads, mining, and industrial projects. Prevailing French colonial policy, which was later reformed by loosening the longstanding restrictions on rice exports towards the end of the nineteenth century, drew in fresh waves of Chinese merchants and shopkeepers who were keen to capitalize on the newly available rice export market. The expanding Vietnamese economy that spurred as a result of the colonial policy reforms further enticed the influx of additional Chinese immigrants, particularly into the southern regions of Vietnam. With a longstanding involvement in the rice trade, the Chinese subsequently broadened their interests to encompass rice-milling and established a virtual monopoly in the industry.

Vietnam's gold industry in particular, was monopolized entirely by Hoa merchants. The Hoa also monopolized Vietnam's entire internal gold procurement and distribution system as the French colonial regime saw that their colonial interests would be better served through the benefits of market expertise imparted by the Chinese and allowed Hoa merchants to freely engage in external trade; sometimes leading to a certain amount of commercial cooperation between the French and Hoa in the import-export sectors. The French would shrewdly cultivate and champion Hoa entrepreneurship as the French colonial administrators welcomed the influx of Chinese immigrants who saw the value of the Chinese community's entrepreneurial acumen that was imperative for the predicated tenability of French colonial rule as well as its corresponding economic prosperity that was submerged within it. The Hoa population rose nearly ten-fold from 25,000 in the 1860s to more than 200,000 in 1911. In addition, Hoa businessmen also functioned as intermediaries by operating as agents for the French as well as their own. Hoa businessmen also collaborated with the French and other European capitalists in tapping the ample riches of Vietnam's well-endowed natural resources and exploiting the indigenous Kinh at their expense via the laissez-faire economic policies enshrined under the aegis of the French colonial authorities to enrich themselves. During the French colonial era, imports were completely under the control of the French authorities, as were nearly all the major import items such as machinery, transport equipment, building materials, and luxury goods that were undertaken by French chartered companies, while the Hoa operated as intermediaries for the French colonial authorities in exchange for a commission.

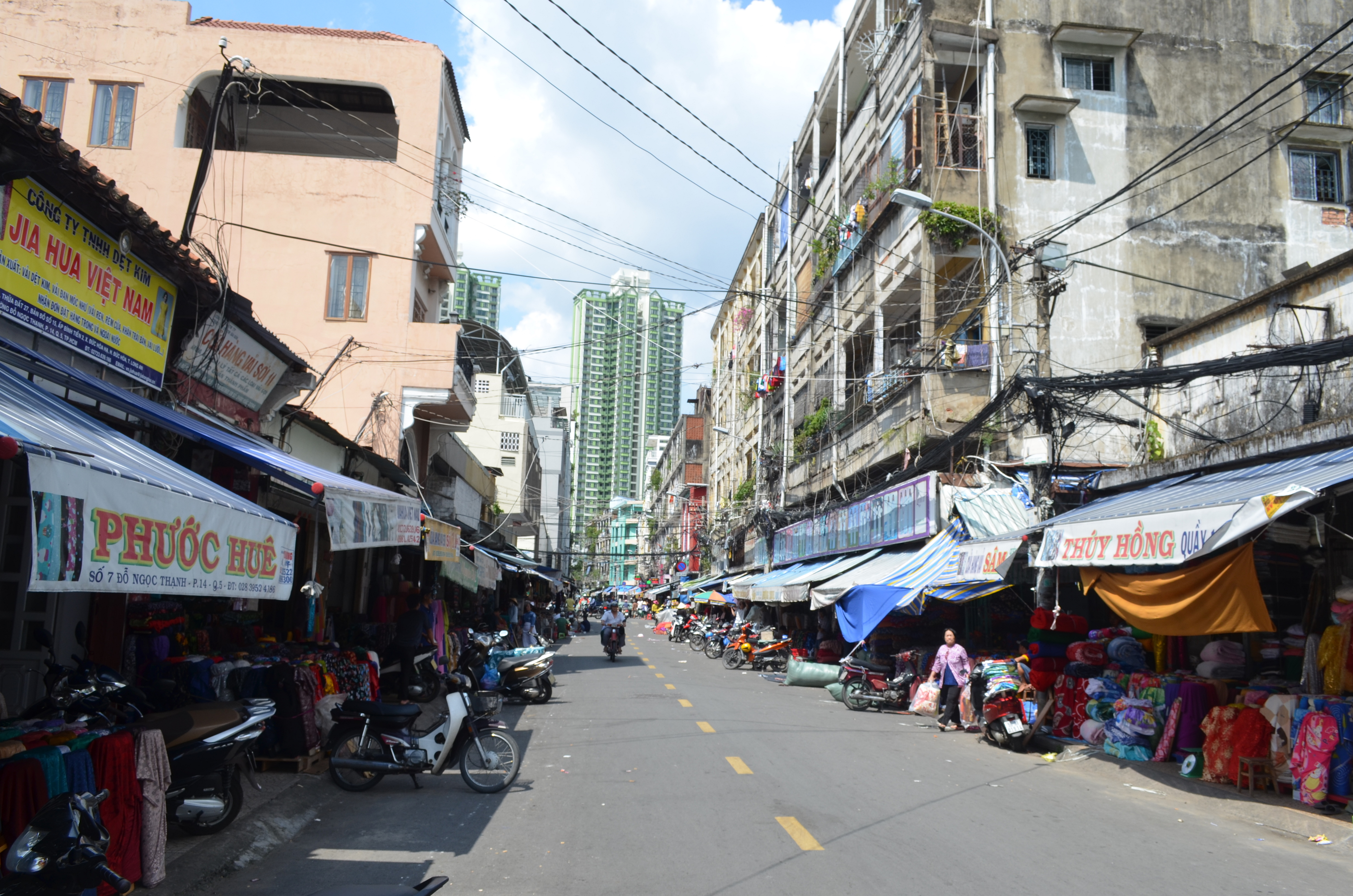
Chợ Lớn was a major business hub of Vietnamese economic life in its day and the heartland of Vietnam's flourishing rice trade. Today, the city continues to remain as one of contemporary Vietnam's leading centers of Hoa economic life.

The first modern mass migration of Han Chinese into Vietnam happened during the late 17th century, when dejected and demoralized Ming generals and their followers fled a defeated and fallen Ming China in the aftermath of the Manchu takeover. As a result of sporadic political upheavals and dynastic conflicts, many of these Chinese emigrants ultimately received significantly large landholdings within the Saigon area and the Mekong Delta, where they settled down and established Chợ Lớn, which soon became Vietnam's most commercially influential city when much of the country's economy came under the commanding influence at the hands of the Hoa by the end of the 17th century. By 1954, Chợ Lớn's population reached a 600,000 strong, making it the second largest host city of Overseas Chinese at the time after Singapore. Chợ Lớn or Big Market during the late nineteenth-century was the principal commercial epicentre essentially ran by Hoa entrepreneurs and investors themselves for them to conduct their commercial business undertakings as it was the place that was the heartland of Hoa economic influence in Vietnam at that time. However, obtrusive resentment and pronounced hostility directed against the vast disproportion of Chinese economic success among the Kinh majority in the vicinity sparked recurrent anti-Hoa reprisals, including the infamous 1782 massacre of some 2000 Hoa in Cholon's Chinatown. The 1782 massacre in which an estimated ten thousand Hoa were mercilessly slaughtered. According to official Vietnamese records, Chinese-owned shops were burned and looted, and the victims, including "men, women, and children," were indiscriminately "killed and their corpses were thrown into the river."

The Hoa wield significant influence over the Vietnam's agricultural sector; while relatively few Hoa are directly involved in the farming process themselves, their provision of loans and transportation services is essential to the livelihood of Vietnamese farmers. Even in Vietnam's rural areas, the Hoa maintain close interactions with a majority of the local Kinh population, constructing a sophisticated economic network founded on trust and credit relationships.

Historically, Vietnam's rice industry has been overseen by the Chinese. They have traditionally held significant influence over all aspects of rice trade, including marketing, transportation, and processing, with reports indicating that they possessed around 75 percent of Vietnam's 70 rice mills. In conjunction with this, they also managed commissaries, grocery stores, and other related enterprises. Their engagement in rice trading was accompanied by the management of commissaries and grocery stores, as well as the facilitation of money-lending during intervals between rice harvests. During the French colonial epoch, Chợ Lớn was well-known for its extensively lush rice endowments, which was a leading source of wealth that formed the wide bulk of the success of capital accumulation among the vast plethora of Hoa-owned rice processing enterprises that predominated throughout the city. Under French rule, the collection of rice paddies in the Mekong delta was completely under Chinese hands who resold it to French companies for export. Industrial commodities imported from France by French companies in Vietnam were retailed to the rural Kinh populace in the South by Hoa merchants, with some of them holding exclusive distribution rights. In 1865, Hoa rice merchants in Cholon created contacts with the Hong Kong and Shanghai Bank to export rice and other agricultural products to Qing China. By 1874, there were fourteen rice exporting companies owned by the Hoa competing with ten European import-export shipping lines. The Grain Merchants Association with its headquarters in Cholon had direct contracts with rice markets in Taiwan, British Hong Kong, Meiji Japan, Rattanakosin Siam, and British Malaya. Seeing the vast opportunities for profitability that could be potentially exploited from Chợ Lớn's rice trade, Hoa rice merchants began to compete with American and European businessmen for industry primacy by vying to capture potential significant shares of Vietnam's then-emerging rice trading market. As Hoa rice merchants wanted a piece of the Vietnamese rice trading market for themselves, they began to establish their own rice processing plants, distribution centres, and trading networks between 1878 and 1886 across South Vietnam with financial backing coming from Overseas Chinese investors in Malacca, Penang, Singapore, and Hong Kong. Of great fundamental importance that became the basis for the prosperity of Hoa in the commercial rice trade was the development of a complex canal system. The control of the Vietnamese cargo system allowed Hoa merchants to dominate Southern Vietnamese commercial trade with thousands of merchant ships under their command transporting rice and other market products back and forth between Southern Vietnam and other rural rice growing regions around the country. The Hoa merchant traders not only controlled the large merchant ships that transported the rice throughout the country, but they also monopolized the entirety of Southern Vietnam's shipping and freight operation industry before 1975. The first steam-operated rice milling enterprise owned by the Hoa came into being in 1876 in Chợ Lớn. By the end of the 19th century, the Hoa controlled 5 of the 8 rice mills in Saigon-Chợ Lớn. Though Hoa rice merchants were pitted in direct competition against their American and European counterparts, the Hoa maintained their grip of the Vietnamese rice trading market, where they controlled seven of the nine rice mills built in Chợ Lớn between 1905 and 1914. From 1905 to 1918, the Hoa controlled 36 out of the 41 total rice mills in Chợ Lớn. In 1920, they expanded to owning 13 out of the 20 rice mills, and by the 1930s, the Chinese ended up owning 75 of the 94 rice mills. By 1940, Hoa rice merchants controlled 90 percent of the rice mills across Chợ Lớn. In its day, Chợ Lớn was the foremost center of Vietnam's economic heartland during the 19th and 20th centuries, with the city to this day having continued to remain and serve as one of contemporary Vietnam's most leading economic nerve centres of modern Hoa commercial life.

Given the ubiquitous predominance of the Hoa that permeated throughout Vietnam's economic life during the early part of the twentieth century, the Hoa emerged as a prosperous economic minority and established themselves as the country's leading entrepreneurs and investors. This was due the fact that the Chinese community's disproportionately high levels of extensive socioeconomic success relative to their small population size made them practically inseparable from the Vietnamese economy. In the fishing sector, the Hoa maintained a strong foothold, particularly with their engagement in deep-sea fishing. Without exception, stiff competition and high rates of attrition between Hoa fishermen drove out and eventually displaced their competing indigenous Kinh counterparts with ease away from the local fish export trade. As a result of cutthroat competition between the Hoa fishermen themselves, the production of nước mắm, a popular Vietnamese fish sauce also ended up being monopolized by them. The Hoa also owned sugar refineries, construction equipment, and industrial machinery manufacturing establishments as well as their own rice and sawmills. Other Hoa businessmen participated in the production of textiles, cotton, sugar, condiments, silk, cinnamon bark, cardamom, as well as partaking in the tea trade. Many Hoa also delved into coconut and peanut oil production prior to beginning their humble business careers as lowly menial labourers on French rubber plantations who eventually worked their way up to start their own tea, pepper, and rice plantations to supply the domestic Vietnamese market. Hoa gardeners monopolized the grocery stores and nurseries in the suburban areas of Saigon while Hoa-owned restaurants and hotels began to take root in every urban Vietnamese market centre.

In 1906, Hoa and French businessmen together generated a combined total capital output of 222 million francs, compared to 2 million francs for the indigenous Kinh majority. In 1930, an estimated 40 Hoa trading cooperatives and 11 French concerns controlled more than 80 percent of Cochinchina's entire export of rice, of which served as the region's leading source of wealth. Throughout the 1930s, open niches and gaps found between the large-scale manufacturing establishments, commercial, plantation, and financial services providers held by the French were filled by smaller businesses controlled by the Chinese. Auspicious economic policies attracted a rapid influx of Han Chinese immigrants who sought to unlock and realize their economic nirvana through business and investment success up until the mid-twentieth century. Between 1925 and 1933, some 600,000 newly-minted Han Chinese immigrants settled in Vietnam. Between 1923 and 1951, as many as 1.2 million Chinese emigrants moved from China to Vietnam. Hoa merchants delved into the rice, salt, liquor, opium, and spice trade, where they set up plantations in the rural hinterlands of the Mekong Delta and sold their finished products in Cholon. In the north, the Hoa were mainly rice farmers, fishermen, and coal miners, except for those residing in cities and provincial towns. The French regularly collaborated with Hoa businessmen in the agricultural and heavy industry sectors, and the latter often served as middlemen to liaise between themselves, the indigenous Kinh masses, and the French in the domestic Vietnamese trading sector. From 1920 to 1940, many Hoa found employment opportunities by working as merchant traders and moneylenders. The Chinese dominated every economic constituent aspect of the Mekong Delta rice market with the lone exception of primary production while controlling the regional export trade in addition to owning nearly all of the rice mills in the Red River Delta. Throughout Southern Vietnam's cities and villages, the Chinese owned and ran the majority of the region's general merchandise stores. Though the Hoa continued to exercise unprecedented and unparalleled economic power relative to their small population numbers from the 1930s to the 1940s, sociological dimensions motivated the Chinese to look towards entrepreneurship and investing as a way to channel their social mobility along class lines as the French-devised social structure was one of rigid inflexibility that also espoused the lack of fluidity that was lodged within it. As such, the potential acquisition of great wealth derived from the enjoyment of a thriving business career was seen by the Hoa as the key gateway of entry into the upper rungs of the Vietnamese socioeconomic ladder. From 1939 to 1945, the number of Chinese-owned rice mills increased from 200 to 334 across Vietnam's southern provinces and the number of rice mills in Saigon owned by them surged from 60 to 79.

=== South Vietnamese rule (1945–1975) ===
As Hoa entrepreneurs in South Vietnam became more financially prosperous, they often pooled large amounts of seed capital and started joint business ventures with expatriate Mainland and Overseas Chinese businessmen and investors from all over the world. Apropos to exports, Hoa businessmen established their own business networks with their fellow Han Chinese business compatriots operating in Mainland China and other Overseas Chinese business community counterparts across Southeast Asia. Analogous to other Southeast Asian businesses owned by those of Chinese ancestry, Hoa-owned businesses in Vietnam often foster corporate partnerships with Greater Chinese and other Overseas Chinese businesses across the globe in search of new business opportunities to capitalize, collaborate, and concentrate on. Besides sharing a common ancestral background in addition to similar cultural, linguistic, and familial ties, many Hoa businessmen and investors are particular strong adherents of the Confucian paradigm of interpersonal relationships when doing business with each other, as the Chinese believed that the underlying source for entrepreneurial and investment success relied on the cultivation of personal relationships. Moreover, Vietnamese businesses that are Chinese-owned form a part of the larger bamboo network, a business network of Overseas Chinese companies operating in the markets of Greater China and Southeast Asia that share common family, ethnic, linguistic, and cultural ties. Hoa have also acted as agents for expatriate Mainland and Overseas Chinese investors outside of Vietnam that act as their underlying providers of economic intelligence. Under the Saigon administration, a rapid horde of expatriate Chinese businessmen and investors from Macau, Hong Kong, and Taiwan came to South Vietnam in search of new business and investment opportunities to exploit. Hoa compradore bourgeoisie in South Vietnam also had the economic and political backing of wealthy expatriate Chinese businessmen from Taiwan and Hong Kong and Overseas Chinese investors in the United States and other countries in Southeast Asia. In addition, prominent Hoa compradore bourgeoisie were often seen colluding and mingling with Saigon's government officials and the South Vietnamese military elite to attain even greater wealth. Moreover, Hoa business networks adhering through the Confucian paradigm of guanxi or personal relationships cooperate with extended family members to marshal capital, make use of technology, and establish distribution networks. In addition, Hoa business networks employ business negotiations in casual settings that go down during Hoa community activities hosted by Hoa-based associations and guilds. Philanthropy is also a major tenet with wealthy Hoa businesspeople often conferring generously charitable donations to the community's less fortunate as well as providing them with the necessary startup financial and social capital to establish their own respective businesses. In a historical sense, the success of Hoa-owned enterprises was mainly due to the heavy premium on the businesses being family-oriented, trust-based networks, latitude towards Han internationalization, and patronage towards the Chinese community. Much like the bamboo network, Hoa-owned businesses and business networks following Đổi Mới center on family management where the company's senior management teams work in unison with the founder's relatives to maintain the organization's day-to-day corporate activities. Many of the founders come from humble beginnings, starting out as physical laborers while establishing their own part-time businesses through borrowing and scraping meager sums of startup seed capital from their families and gradually pass down the business to the next generation.

From 1948 to 1955, the Hoa played a major role in the production, slaughter, and retailing of pork in Saigon-Cholon. Through Vietnam's southern cities, the Hoa predominated the herbal and medicinal trade throughout the early 1950s in addition running a manifold of noodle stalls, restaurants, and teahouses and maintained a commanding position in the trade of dried and salted fish. Throughout 1945 to 1954, Hoa business families were engaged in the production of silk and textile manufacturing coupled with various Hoa subgroups monopolized ventured into different industries throughout the tapestry of Hoa economic life. The Hokkien participated in shipbuilding, ran banks, and operated rubber, confectionery, coconut oil plantations. The Hainanese along the outskirts of large Vietnamese cities worked as market gardeners and pepper farmers and ran restaurant chains within their confines while the Teochew worked as textile merchants, butchers, book dealers, manual laborers, and in the fishing sector. Until the nationality regulations that were enacted by the Vietnamese government in 1956, the Hoa controlled well over 80 percent of the country's entire retail trade.

By the 1950s, the Hoa had held enormous sway on Vietnam's economic life as the concomitant brunt that came with the societal implications of wielding such vast amounts of economic power, the Chinese community was stereotypically viewed as "a state within a state," forming a more separately distinct cosmopolitan and wealthier population than the host indigenous Kinh majority. The Hoa controlled the broad bulk of South Vietnam's economy as their disproportionate economic influence and pronounced economic success invariably inflamed and incurred the wrath, resentment, envy, insecurity, and outright hostility from their Kinh counterparts. Despite being naturalized as Vietnamese citizens, the Hoa remained supine from the mainstream currents of Vietnamese society expressed by their desire of wanting themselves to thoroughly stay Chinese at heart in their private lives. Cultural distinctions were delineated along ethno-racial lines that were reinforced by the Chinese community's committed attachments to their Han ancestral histories to link fellow Hoa families by kinship ties as well as adhering to the traditional patterns of personal and social relations governed in accordance to the enduring principles of Confucianism. Given the Hoa community's propensity of wanting to remain separate and distinct from the mainstream currents of Vietnamese life, it prompted them to voluntarily disassociate and segregate themselves from the Kinh majority by typically acting through their own autonomous engagement in associating with the Chinese community at large. The Hoa satisfied their desires by attending Chinese institutions and marrying within the Han Chinese community while projecting a sense of Han "superiority," "clannishness," and unabashedly affirming a distinctive sense of their own Han ethnic identity, nationalism, and cultural exclusivity against their Kinh majority counterparts. After the French colonial authorities withdrew from Vietnam in the 1950s, the Ngo Dinh Diem government tried to Vietnamize the economy by curbing the amount of Hoa and French participation while trying to increase the amount of Kinh economic participation to gain a proportionate foothold relative to their population size. Inauspiciously, such policy enactments to curb Hoa economic influence was counterproductive to no avail, where corresponding countermeasures only backfired when the Kinh who wanted to push back against the ubiquity of Hoa economic clout through the engagement of their own commercial activities led them to being unable to compete against their Hoa-owned business counterparts. As the Kinh only ended up wasting their engagement efforts when their ventures employed to curtail and counter the vast disproportion of Chinese economic influence ultimately went under due to a deficiency of capital and weak business ties outside the country. Up until the 1960s, the Hoa alongside their Overseas Chinese counterparts dominated Vietnam's garment and textile industries, as the nation's 600 small and medium sized textile businesses and top 3 textile manufacturing firms Vinatex; Vinatexco; and Vinatefico were the controlling ownership of Chinese hands that supplied up to four-fifths of the entire nation's collection of textile products. The Hoa also dominated Vietnam's processing sectors such as the cooking oil, dairy, cosmetics, plastics, and rubber industries in addition to controlling 80 percent of the largest metallurgical factories in South Vietnam. With much of the buzz surrounding the overwhelming dominance of the Chinese in the Vietnamese retail merchant trade, centrally integral to the fundamentals of that dominance were attributed to the development of extensive systems of canals allowing Chinese merchant traders to exert their economic clout and maintain their monopoly on Vietnam's shipping industry. Hoa retail merchants also controlled the wholesale trades in Binh Tay, An Dong and Soai Kinh Lam and the merchants were also behind three-fifths of the retail goods that were distributed throughout Southern Vietnam. In Vietnamese business circles, the Hoa were dubbed as "crownless kings", "rice kings", "oil kings", "gasoline kings", or "scrap-iron kings" with regard to their shrewd business acumen and investment prowess throughout Chợ Lớn, which was a center of Hoa private enterprise throughout the South. Highly publicized profiles of wealthy Hoa businessmen and investors often attracted great public interest and were used to illustrate the Chinese community's strong economic clout throughout the country. The huge materials supply chain system ensured maximum support for Hoa businesspeople to gain complete access to whatever goods and services they had to provide for sale to their clientele. The South Vietnamese market was allegedly calibrated in favour of the Hoa so as to ensure maximum profits and manipulation of prices executed through the Vietnamese import-export and transport systems. One of the most notorious of South Vietnam's Hoa compradore bourgeoisie was a businessman and investor by the name of Ly Long Than, who reportedly held a diverse portfolio of business assets ranging from 18 major commercial and industrial manufacturing establishments (Vinatexco and Vinafilco textile factories, Vinatefinco dye-works, Vicasa steel factory, Nakydaco edible oil factory) in addition to presiding the Rang Dong shipping line, a real estate holding company, a plush hotel, an insurance agency, a chain of restaurants, as well as being a controlling shareholder in sixteen Vietnamese banks including the Vietnamese branches of the Bank of China and the Agricultural Bank of China respectively, as well as the Agriculture Industry Commerce Bank. Foreign investors and visitors doing business in Chợ Lớn would recall seeing the plethora of import-export shipping lines, banks, modern high-rise buildings, plush hotels, bars, discotheques, and restaurants all controlled by Hoa businessmen and investors. Other notable Hoa compradore bourgeoisie investors include Hoan Kim Quy, a native of Hanoi who derived his private fortune from barbed wire manufacturing and presided over a prominent shipping line, the operation of a large textile and appliance importer, a gold mining concession, and a trading cooperative. He also served as the corporate director of the Vitaco shipping line and was a major shareholder in several Vietnamese banks.

The Chinese presence in the Vietnamese economy has been likened to that of the vital "blood circulation system of a human body." This level of indispensability can be attributed to the widespread involvement of the Chinese in various sectors of economic activity, particularly in trade - where they controlled a majority of Vietnamese trade in 1958 - as well as banking and commerce. Also in 1958, the Hoa controlled 60 percent of Saigon's 70 rice mills in addition to owning 580 spinning and weaving firms that operated as small family businesses. Their Overseas Chinese compatriots that operated across the Southeast Asian markets played an imperative role in Vietnam's transportation sector and dominated the country's import-export trade. By 1961, the Hoa controlled 80 percent of all the capital in Vietnam's retail trade and 75 percent of the entire nation's commercial activities. Utilizing the Confucian paradigm of personal networks, the Hoa dominated several types of industries such as financial services, food, information technology, chemicals, electronic and electrical equipment, machinery, fabricated metals, wholesale trade, transportation equipment, and other miscellaneous services. Constituting a mere 1 percent of Vietnam's population, the Hoa controlled an estimated 90 percent of non-European private capital in the mid-1960s and dominated Vietnam's entire retail trade, financial services sector, manufacturing establishments, transportation outlets, and all aspects of the country's rice trade. In the hospitality industry, the Hoa owned more than 50 percent of all the largest hotels and 90 percent of small hotels and boarding houses in the Saigon-Cholon and Gia Dinh areas respectively, in addition to 92 large restaurants, 243 tea and beer shops, 48 hotels, and 826 eateries. Furthermore, the Hoa controlled much of the restaurants, drink and hotels, amusement parks and recreation centres, medical, educational, and other miscellaneous establishments throughout Vietnam. In particular, Hoa businessmen operated restaurants and hotels as a launchpad to eventually scale up and venture out into other businesses since these businesses turned in a quick profit while requiring negligible amounts of startup capital to take off from scratch. Furthermore, due to the lack of bureaucratic red tape, hospitality companies were not regulated by the Vietnamese government nor were they subject to local discriminatory policies. Although there were numerous wealthy Kinh in the Vietnamese commercial class, the vast disproportion of economic power still remained concentrated in the hands of the Hoa minority, attracting the outright resentment, jealousy, insecurity, envy, and hostility from the Kinh majority.

Throughout the mid-1960s, the Hoa developed large scale monopolies and oversaw powerful financial cartels that resulted in huge amounts of wealth to be concentrated in Chinese hands. Their Overseas Chinese compatriots derived enormous fortunes rooted in their elaborate labyrinth of exclusive rotating credit associations that gave them a distinctive competitive edge over their rivals. By 1970, it was estimated that while the Hoa made up a mere 5.3 percent of Vietnam's total population, they reputedly controlled 70 to 80 percent of the entire country's commercial sector. In 1971, Hoa controlled 2492 shops, equivalent to 41 percent of all the small and medium-sized shops operated in Saigon-Cholon's nine districts. In addition, the Hoa respectively controlled 100 percent of the wholesale and 50 percent retail trade in South Vietnam before 1975. Hoa-owned businesses controlled much of the economic activity in Saigon in South Vietnam where they controlled 80 percent of South Vietnam's overall industry despite making up a tiny percentage of South Vietnam's population. Prior to the Fall of Saigon, the Chinese controlled 40.9 percent of the small-scale enterprises, 100 percent of the wholesale trade in South Vietnam, transitioning from smaller-scale retail outlets to larger wholesale enterprises. Hoa-owned enterprises made up 45.6 percent of all the enterprises handling the Vietnamese import trade in the early 1970s. In addition, 815 of the 966 direct and indirect importers in 1971 were controlled by the Hoa along with 300 Hoa-owned shipping lines that operated in Ho Chi Minh City alone with as many as fifty large Chinese agents operating on behalf of these shipping agencies brokering deals in exchange for the demand of various agricultural, seafood, and forestry products. Throughout the early 1970s, the Hoa firmly retained the control of the country's rice milling enterprises, retail trading cooperatives, pawnshops, moneylending services, and various key import-export markets. During the course of this period, Vietnam's river transportation business was mainly under the Hoa's operational control. As the Hoa operated and owned several small steamboats that transported the rice paddies from the country's outlying regions to Saigon, which represented their main export market of focus.

During the Vietnam War, the wealth of the Hoa increased dramatically and intensified as they seized lucrative business opportunities which auspiciously presented themselves that coincided with the arrival of the American troops, who required a trade and services network to accommodate their military needs. The war prompted the South Vietnamese government to gradually liberalize and deregulate the economy, adopting relatively liberal market policies which caused the local Hoa business community to exploit the opportunities that materialized where it invariably allowed them to even extend their commercial dominance into Southern Vietnam's light industry. Throughout the course of the war, the Hoa took advantage of American foreign aid and expanded not only their trade and services networks, but also their operations in other industry domains that allowed them to control nearly all the key sectors of South Vietnam's economy such as trade, industry, banking, communications, and transportation. Of more than the US$100 billion poured into the war effort by the United States, a vast disproportion ended up in the hands of the Hoa, effectively enriching them in the process despite their perennial economic influence which in effect only intensified the aggregate amount of wealth and economic power held in Chinese hands. The capital input and eventual expansion of the war effort invariably spurred unprecedented economic growth throughout the South during the 1960s and early 1970s, as the network of roads and communicative infrastructure had game-changing effects that aided and augmented the development and growth of the Hoas' commercial grip throughout Southern Vietnam's private business sector. In 1972, the Hoa owned 28 of the 32 banks in South Vietnam, handled more than 60 percent of the total volume of goods imported into South Vietnam through American aid, and comprised 84 percent of the direct and indirect shipping importers. In 1974, Hoa investment in the amusement and recreation sector was 20 percent and made up 80 percent of the total investment in the medical and health services industry. At the end of 1974, the Hoa controlled more than 80 percent of the food, textile, chemical, metallurgy, engineering, and electrical industries, 100 percent of wholesale trade, more than 50 percent of retail trade, and 90 percent of the export-import trade in South Vietnam. The Hoas' commercial predominance over the South Vietnamese economy enabled them to "manipulate prices" of rice and other scarce goods that were traded on the South Vietnamese commodities markets. Other major industries in the South such as steel fabricating, textile manufacturing, rice processing, the import-export trade, and cement mixing were under the economic hegemony of the Hoa. The Hoa controlled nearly two-thirds of the amount of cash in circulation, 80 percent of the processing industry, 80 percent of the fixed assets in manufacturing, 100 percent of the wholesale trade, 50 percent of the retail trade, and 90 percent of the import-export trade. The Hoa monopolized 100 percent of the grain trade and obtained 80 percent of the credits from South Vietnamese banks, and controlled 42 out of the 60 companies with a turnover of more than 1 billion piasters including major banks while accounting for two-thirds of the total annual investments throughout the South. In addition, the Hoa were responsible for generating 75 percent of the commercial economic outturn in South Vietnam in 1975, including controlling 100 percent of the domestic wholesale trade, 80 percent of the industry, 70 percent of the foreign trade, and presided over half the country's retail trade. In spite of the Vietnam War that took place, the Hoa continued commercially thrive and dominate Southern Vietnamese commerce and industry, where upwards 80 to 90 percent of the South's wholesale and retail trade fell under the control of Chinese hands. Hoa businessmen also controlled trade in strategic wholesale markets such as Binh Tay, An Dong, and Soai Kinh Lam. In addition, the Hoa also controlled the entire wholesale system, where upwards 60 percent of retail goods were distributed by Hoa entrepreneurs throughout various Southern Vietnamese provinces and into the neighbouring country of Cambodia. With the Hoas' pervasive economic grasp in the palm of their hands in the South, some 117 of the 670 leading Southern Vietnamese business families were of Chinese ancestry.

Prior to 1975, the influx of Chinese investment capital, entrepreneurship, and skilled manpower in South Vietnam played a significant role in shaping the development of Vietnam's domestic markets and international trade. In South Vietnam, Hoa controlled more than 90 percent of the non-European capital, 80 percent of the food, textile, chemical, metallurgy, engineering, and electrical industries, 100 percent of the wholesale trade, more than 50 percent of the retail trade, and 90 percent of the import-export trade. Of the Chinese-owned factories and manufacturing establishments that operated in Southern Vietnam before 1975, the Hoa controlled 62.5 percent of the food manufacturing, 100 percent of the tobacco manufacturing, 84.6 percent of the textile manufacturing, 100 percent of the pulp and paper mills, 100 percent of the chemical production, 100 percent of the pottery-making, 100 percent of the steel and iron fabrication, 100 percent of the engineering, 80 percent of the food processing, and 100 percent of the print manufacturing. The sheer overwhelming economic dominance presided by the Hoa prompted resentful accusations from the Kinh majority who felt that they could not successfully compete against Chinese-owned businesses in a free market capitalist system. With the Hoas' glaringly omnipresent economic clout, it was noted by 1983 that more than 60 percent of Southern Vietnam's bourgeoisie were of Han Chinese ancestry. Hoa merchants controlled the entirety of South Vietnam's rice paddy market and obtained up to 80 percent of the South's bank loans. Furthermore, Hoa entrepreneurs and investors also owned 42 of the 60 of South Vietnam's corporations with an annual turnover of more than 1 million dong and their investments accounted for two-thirds of the aggregate investment in the South.

The Hoa also came to predominate Vietnam's financial services sector as they were also the sole pioneers of the Vietnamese financial services industry, being the key masterminds that played a major role behind the emergence of some of Vietnam's early banking houses and esteemed financial institutions. Early in the twentieth century, the Franco-Chinese bank was jointly established by French and Hoa businessmen and investors in Saigon-Cholon. After the inauguration of the bank, initial capital swelled from 10 million to 50 million francs within the span of half a decade. After reaping the teachings of sound Western banking practices under French stewardship and tutelage, the Hoa would soon capitalize on their learned knowledge and experience by going on to establish and manage their own banks, providing much needed credit and loans to accommodate the seed capital needs of Hoa rice merchants in addition to bankrolling their own pawnshops. Pawnshops and moneylending services under the ownership of Hoa community contribute significantly to the Vietnamese banking sector by providing credit facilities and loans to small businesses, as well as to individuals in the urban Vietnamese working class and agricultural communities among the country's rural populace. During the early years of the Republic of Vietnam, the Hoa controlled three of the ten private banks throughout the country while the rest were either British and French-owned. Furthermore, the Hoa also controlled foreign branches of banks based in Mainland China such as the Bank of China, Bank of Communications, and Bank of East Asia, all of which had a direct international presence in pioneering Vietnam's banking sector. In South Vietnam, 28 of the 32 banks were controlled by the Hoa with the amount of capital under Chinese hands having accounted for 49 percent of the total capital invested in eleven local private banks in 1974. Additionally, the Hoa also ran the bank's Chinese Affairs Office to serve the needs of the Hoa business community. One high-profile success story within the pioneering of Vietnam's banking industry is owed to the Hoa banker and businessman, Đặng Văn Thành. Thành who established Sacombank in 1991, has since then emerged as one of Vietnam's leading banks eventually becoming the first bank to be listed on the Ho Chi Minh Stock Exchange in December 2006. Today, Sacombank deals with many banking industry constituents such as operating as a wealth management house, investment bank, corporate financial advisory, brokerage, and private equity firm. On 10 August 2007, Thành fulfilled his pledge to the Hoa community by inaugurating a Sacombank branch for them called Hoa-Viet Branch. The specialized bank branch located in the Chinatown district of Ho Chi Minh City serves a financial services institution that specifically deals with Hoa clients and addresses the local banking needs of the Hoa community in Mandarin. Thành, a second-generation Hoa of Hainanese ancestry on his father's side, began his humble business career by operating several small factories that made sugar cane, cooking wine, and cattle feed. Thành then ventured out into the banking sector when he assumed the position as the Chairman of the Thành Công banking cooperative and joining Sacombank's board of directors in 1993, where he was then promoted as Chairman two years later. The expansion of the bank and its subsequent success formed much of Thành's individual and private family fortune as his family was ranked as one of the top ten wealthiest in Vietnam in 2008. 2014 was a major breakout year for Sacombank as it announced its merger with another bank by the name of Southern Bank, which is owned by Trầm Bê, a fellow Hoa banker and businessman of Teochew ancestry. Today, Thành's wife and children play a major role in conducting and operating the family's day-to-day business activities, which have since then expanded into real estate and brewing. Of the five women that make up Thành's immediate and extended family, possess an aggregate net worth of 2,178 billion đồng (USD$136.12 million).

=== Reunification and Doi Moi (1975–present) ===
The control and regulation of markets were one of the most sensitive, controversial, and persistent political issues faced by the Vietnamese revolutionary government following the beginning of North-South integration in 1975. The incoming Lê Duẩn administration, in its doctrinaire efforts to nationalize the commercial market-oriented Southern economy, faced several paradoxes. The first was the need to both cultivate and to curtail the heavy presence of commercial business activity controlled by Hoa in the South, especially in Ho Chi Minh City, as Chinese-owned businesses controlled much of the city's commercial activity and the Southern Vietnamese economy in general. Approximately one-fifth of the city's 6,000 private companies and 150,000 small businesses were operated by the Hoa community. The commercial endeavors of these businesses contributed to over 30% to the overall business output of Ho Chi Minh City, largely owing to the superior equipment utilized by these enterprises. Following the breakdown of relations with China in 1978, some Vietnamese political leaders evidently feared the potential for espionage activities within the Hoa business community. On the one hand, Hoa-owned businesses controlled trade in a number of commodities and services including the development of pharmaceuticals, fertilizer distribution, grain milling, and foreign-currency exchange dealers, as such businesses were ostensibly presumed to be state-owned and operated monopolies. On the other hand, Hoa businessmen also provided excellent access to international markets for Vietnamese exports through Hong Kong and Singapore. Such access became increasingly crucial during the 1980s as a way of circumventing the boycott on trade with Vietnam imposed by a number of Continental Asian and Western nations. Southern Vietnamese politicians said the Hoa business community in Chợ Lớn also remained active in municipal politics and the Vietnamese Communist Party, but maintained their primary interest of focus of entrepreneurship, business, and investing. For centuries, the Chinese have been influential in Vietnam's economic activities while remaining detached from the nation's political affairs. This merely points up the fact, acknowledged by scholars specializing in Overseas Chinese immigration is that the overseas Chinese community remain primarily focused on their commercial business pursuits and economic activities, through earning a livelihood and accumulating wealth, and thus take only a passive interest in the formal political affairs of the countries in which they reside. Regardless of the Vietnamese political climate, the Hoa business community felt secure when partaking in business in everyday public life as well as engaging in activities that improved and enriched their social and cultural lives in private.

After the reunification of Vietnam in 1976, the socialist and revolutionary Vietnamese government started to use the Hoa as a convenient scapegoat for the nation's socioeconomic woes. The revolutionary government referred to the enterprising Chinese as "bourgeois" and perpetrators of "world capitalism." Brutal draconian policies instituted against the Chinese involved the "Employing the techniques Hitler used to inflame hatred against the Jews" as reported by the U.S. News and World Report's Ray Wallace in 1979, which led many Hoa being persecuted by fleeing the country or succumbing to death after laboring in Vietnam's so-called "new economic zones." Many Hoa had their businesses and property confiscated by the Communists after 1975, and with many Hoa having fled the country as boat people due to persecution by the newly established Communist government. Hoa persecution intensified in the late 1970s with some were even forcibly "kicked out" of the country, at a time when Vietnam had serious tensions with China in the late 1970s, and the government feared of the Hoa collaborating with the Chinese communist government as a result of the Sino-Vietnamese War. Though the remaining Chinese still cornered an estimated 66% of the fledgling private economy, mainly concentrated in Saigon. Despite undergoing many years of persecution by the socialist Vietnamese government, the Hoa have begun to reassert and regain much of the economic grip that they previously held in the Vietnamese economy. Since the early 1980s, the Vietnamese government has gradually reintegrated the Chinese community into laying the groundwork for Vietnam's mainstream economic development. By 1986, changes implemented through the Doi Moi reforms encouraged the Hoa to actively take part in parlaying the economic development of Vietnam. Such sweeping reforms enabled the Hoa community to once again reassert their dominance as a significant economic powerhouse in the country, reclaiming a substantial level of clout that they had previously held within the Vietnamese private sector. Since the late 1980s, extensive economic reforms and the consistent implementation of new policies have enabled the Hoa community to broaden their economic ventures and exert greater influence over a significant portion of the economy.

Until the early 1990s, Hoa-owned businesses in Ho Chi Minh City contributed to 40 percent of its entire gross domestic product output. The effects and outcomes resulting from the post-1988 Doi Moi reforms have enabled the Hoa community to once again reestablish themselves as the country's most dominant economic force and reclaim a significant amount of clout that they previously possessed. By the 1990s, the commercial role and influence of Hoa in Vietnam's economy have rebounded substantially since the introduction of Doi Moi as the Vietnamese government's post-1988 shift to a capitalist-based free-market liberalization has led to an astounding resurgence of Chinese economic dominance across the country's urban areas. Large Vietnamese companies owned and operated by the Hoa have been established since the early 1990s, include the Viet-Hoa Construction Company, which also operates in the hotel and banking sectors, as well as the Viet Huong Instant Noodle Processing Company and Binh Tien (Biti's) Footwear Enterprise. According to District 5 statistics from the Vietnamese Department of Industry and Trade in 1990, there were 8653 registered Chinese business households of which 963 were running hotels and restaurants and 854 services. Registered Hoa-owned businesses made up 75 percent of all the market stalls in the urban market district of Binh Ta, the largest wholesale market throughout the entire country. Across the country, enterprising Hoa entrepreneurs and investors have re-asserted much of their previous economic influence that they once held prior to 1975. The Hoa with their commercial prowess have once again begun to contribute significantly to the expansive development of Vietnamese internal markets and capital accumulation where both of which are served for the purpose of small-scale industrial business incubation, as 45 percent of all privately registered Vietnamese businesses were under the hands of a Chinese-descended founder in 1992. In Ho Chi Minh City alone, Hoa entrepreneurs have been responsible for generating half of the city's commercial market activity as well as having percolated their economic primacy into Vietnam's light industry, import-export trade, shopping malls, and private banking sector. In 1996, Hoa entrepreneurs continued to dominate Vietnam's private industry and were responsible for generating an estimated $4 billion in commercial business volume, making up one-fifth of the entire country's aggregate domestic business output.

== Modern population ==
The official census from 2019 accounted the Hoa population at 749,466 individuals and ranked 9th in terms of its population size. 70% of the Hoa live in cities and towns in which they make up the largest minority group, mostly in Ho Chi Minh city while the remainder live in the countryside in the southern provinces. The Hoa had constituted the largest ethnic minority group in the mid 20th century and its population had previously peaked at 1.2 million, or about 2.6% of Vietnam's population in 1976 a year following the end of the Vietnam War. Just 3 years later, the Hoa population dropped to 935,000 as large swathes of Hoa left Vietnam. The 1989 census indicated the Hoa population had appreciated to 960,000 individuals, but their proportion had dropped to 1.5% by then. In 1999, the Hoa population at some 860,000 individuals, or approximately 1.1% of the country's population and by then, were ranked Vietnam's 4th largest ethnic group.

=== Ancestral affiliations ===
The Hoa trace their ancestral origins to different parts of China many centuries ago and they are identified based on the dialects that they speak. In cities where large Chinese communities exist such as Ho Chi Minh City, Chinese communities set up clan associations that identify themselves based on surnames or their ancestral homeland. In southern Vietnam, five different bang or clans are traditionally recognized within the Hoa community: Quảng (Cantonese), Tiều (Teochew), Hẹ (Hakka), Phúc Kiến (Hokkien) and Hải Nam (Hainanese), with the Cantonese forming the largest group. Each of these Hoa sub-groups tends to congregate in different towns and one dialect group may predominate over the others.

Population profile of Hoa by ancestral origin
Dialect Group	1924	1950	1974	1989	Main areas of living
Cantonese (Quảng)	35.0%	45.0%	60.0%	56.5%	Ho Chi Minh City, Đồng Nai, Mỹ Tho
Teochew (Tiều)	22.0%	30.0%	20.0%	34.0%	Ho Chi Minh City, Cần Thơ, Sóc Trăng, Kiên Giang, Bạc Liêu, Cà Mau
Hoklo (Hokkien)	24.0%	8.0%	7.0%	6.0%	Ho Chi Minh City, Hội An, Huế
Hakka (Hẹ)/Ngái	7.0%	10.0%	6.0%	1.5%	Quảng Ninh, Bình Thuận, Đồng Nai, Lâm Đồng
Hainanese	7.0%	4.0%	7.0%	2.0%	Phú Quốc, Ninh Hòa, Tuy Hòa, Nha Trang
Others	5.0%	3.0%	-	-	–

=== Other Sinitic groups ===
- Ngái (Chinese: 𠊎) are mostly Hakka-spoken people classified distinctly by the Vietnamese government. Other groups such as Lê or Đản are also classified as Ngái.
- Sán Dìu (Chinese: 山由) are a Yue-speaking group of Yao origins living around the Tam Đảo range in Northern Vietnam. Thái Nguyên province also has some ethnic Hoa who speak Quan hỏa.
- Chinese Nùng (Hoa Nùng; not to be confused with the Tai-speaking Nùng, an ethnic group in Vietnam relating to the Zhuang of China). The Chinese Nùng are Hakka- and Cantonese-speaking people from the region of eastern Quảng Ninh and Lạng Sơn provinces. After 1954, about 50,000 Chinese Nùng resettled in Bình Thuận and Đồng Nai provinces. Some identify themselves as Ngái. Most of them are now classified as Hoa.
- Xạ Phang (Chinese: 下方) are a group of 2,000 Chinese speakers mainly living in western districts of Điện Biên province. They immigrated from China during the 20th century. They mostly speak Quan hỏa (Southwestern Mandarin).
- Sán Chay (Chinese: 山泽), also known as Cao Lan, are an ethnic group living sporadically in Northern Vietnam. The majority of the Sán Chay people speak Cao Lan, a Kra–Dai language, while some of them speak Pạc và (Chinese: 白话), referring to Yue Chinese as a lingua franca. According to 2009 census, there are 18,444 ethnic Hoa in Bắc Giang province, the majority of them living in Lục Ngạn district. Many among the Hoa in Bắc Giang have shifted to identifying as Nùng, Cao Lan, or Kinh.

== Diaspora ==
Today, there are many Hoa communities in western countries like Australia, Canada, France, United Kingdom and the United States, where they have reinvigorated old existing Chinatowns. For example, the established Chinatowns of Los Angeles, Oakland, Houston, Dallas, Toronto, Honolulu, and Paris have a Vietnamese atmosphere due to the large presence of Hoa people. Some of these communities also have associations for transplanted Hoa refugees such as the Association des Résidents en France d'origine indochinoise in Paris.

Hoa communities, that fled discrimination and anti-chinese policies, in places like Hong Kong and south east asia now mostly associate with the local Chinese/overseas community, due to the similarities.

Orange County, California, is also home to a significant Hoa diaspora community, along with Cabramatta, New South Wales, Australia and Mississauga, Ontario, Canada.

The Chinese Vietnamese population in China numbered up to 300,000 by the year 2000, and lived mostly in 194 refugee settlements mostly in the provinces of Guangdong, Guangxi, Hainan, Fujian, Yunnan and Jiangxi. More than 85% have achieved economic independence, but the remainder live below the poverty line in rural areas. While they have most of the same rights as Chinese nationals, including employment, education, housing, property ownership, pensions, and health care, they had not been granted citizenship and continued to be regarded by the government as refugees. Their refugee status allowed them to receive UN High Commissioner for Refugees (UNHCR) assistance and aid until the early 21st century. In 2007, the Chinese government began drafting legislation to grant full Chinese citizenship to Indochinese refugees, including the ethnic Hoa which make up the majority, living within its borders.

== Genetics ==
Frequencies of the main mtDNA haplogroups and sub-haplogroups by ethnic group
Haplogroups: A B C D M (xD,C) N(xB,R9'F,A) R9'F
Vietnam (n = 622)
2%
25%
5%
5%
29%
7%
27%

Kinh (n = 399)
1%
23%
2%
4%
35%
8%
27%

Hmong (n = 115)
5%
41%
13%
7%
8%
9%
16%

Tay (n = 62)
2%
16%
7%
5%
34%
7%
30%

Hoa (n = 23)
13%
17%
22%
9%
39%

Nung (n = 21)
5%
10%
5%
14%
38%
5%
24%

Source: Figure 1 A, Page 6, Sara Pischedda et al. (2017)

Although native Kinh Vietnamese predominantly have southern Chinese ancestry, which is closely related to Lingnan Han, Hoa people differ slightly in terms of haplogroup frequencies. For example, haplogroup O1b1a2 and its sublineages peak in Hoa people, which are also more common for eastern Chinese and Chinese living in the southeastern regions of northeast China. Frequency of maternal haplogroup R9'F (39%) is substantially higher for Hoa than the average Vietnamese (27%).

== Notable Hoa people ==
=== Chinese-led independent "Vietnamese" dynasties ===
The following Vietnamese dynasties have historically personally claimed to be of Chinese origin:

- Au Lac – Founder/King An Dương Vương – Origins in Shu
- Nanyue/Trieu Dynasty – Founder/King Triệu Đà/Zhao Guo – Origins in Qin
- Dai Viet/Ly dynasty – Founder/King Lý Thái Tổ – Min Chinese
- Dai Viet/Tran dynasty – Founder/King Trần Thái Tông – Min Chinese
- Dai Viet/Ho dynasty – Founder/King Hồ Quý Ly – Origins in modern day ZheJiang

=== Historical figures ===
- Lý Tài, merchant pirate.
- Trần Văn Lắm, President of the Vietnamese senate and minister for foreign affairs for the Republic of Vietnam during the height of the Vietnam War
- Lai Teck, leader of the Communist Party of Malaya and Malayan People's Anti-Japanese Army
- Lâm Quang Thi, Lieutenant General of Army of the Republic of Vietnam during the Vietnam War
- Lê Văn Viễn, Major General of the Vietnamese National Army and head of Bình Xuyên, a powerful Vietnamese crime syndicate
- Nguyễn Lạc Hoá, refugee nationalist Catholic priest, leader of the "Nung fighters" in Cà Mau during the Vietnam War (Originally from Guangxi, China)

=== Celebrities ===
- Hà Vương Ngầu Nại, Vietnamese footballer
- La Hối, Vietnamese musician
- Lam Trường, Vietnamese singer
- Lương Bích Hữu, Vietnamese actress and pop singer
- Lý Hùng, Vietnamese vovinam artist, actor, film director, producer, entrepreneur, philanthropist, activist, and singer
- Tống Anh Tỷ, Vietnamese footballer
- Trấn Thành, MC and artist
- Tăng Thanh Hà, Vietnamese actress and model

=== Hoa diaspora ===
- David Tran, Founder of Huy Fong Foods Sriracha
- Carol Huynh, Canadian wrestler
- Chi Muoi Lo, actor, writer, director, and producer
- Learner Tien, American tennis player
- Chau Giang, American poker player, three-time World Series of Poker bracelet winner and three-time final tablist of the World Poker Tour
- Frank Jao, prominent American businessman in Southern California
- Jack Lee, American celebrity chef
- Eric Ly, American entrepreneur, investor and co-founder of LinkedIn
- Ching Hai, spiritual leader of the Guanyin Famen (Chinese) or Quan Yin Method transnational cybersect (Real Name: Hue Dang Trinh)
- Ray Lui Leung-Wai, Hong Kong actor, famous for his role in TVB Classic, The Bund, of Hakka ancestry with roots in Luchuan, Guangxi
- Pauline Chan, Australian actress, director, screenwriter, and producer
- Jeannie Mai, American television host, make-up artist, and stylist
- Jennifer Pan, Canadian woman who committed matricide
- Kyle Colonna, American soccer player
- Gia Huy Phong, German footballer
- Eliza Sam, Canadian actress
- Vico Thai, Australian actor
- Priscilla Chan, philanthropist and spouse of Mark Zuckerberg
- Ke Huy Quan, American Academy award-winning actor and stunt choreographer
- Tsui Hark, Hong Kong film director, producer, and screenwriter
- Wan Kwong, Hong Kong singer, known as "The Temple Street Prince" (Real Name: Lui Minkwong)
- Wong Kwok-hing, Hong Kong trade unionist and a former member of the Legislative Council of Hong Kong
- Olivia Munn, American Actress
- France Nuyen, French-American Actress
- Krew, a Canadian YouTube gaming group, consists of Kat La (Funneh), Betty La (Rainbow), Kim La (Gold), Wenny La (Lunar), and Allen La (Draco), all of whom are siblings

== See also ==
- China–Vietnam relations
- Demographics of Vietnam
- Hoa people in Ho Chi Minh City
- Indochina refugee crisis

== Bibliography ==
=== English ===
- Amer, Ramses (April 1996). "Vietnam's Policies and Ethnic Chinese since 1975". Sojourn. 11 (1): 76–104. JSTOR 41056928.
- Andaya, Barbara Watson (2006). The flaming womb: repositioning women in early modern Southeast Asia. University of Hawaii Press. p. 146. ISBN 978-0-8248-2955-1.
- Anderson, David (2005). The Vietnam War (Twentieth Century Wars). Palgrave. ISBN 978-0333963371.
- Anderson, James A.; Whitmore, John K. (2014). China's Encounters on the South and Southwest: Reforging the Fiery Frontier Over Two Millennia (reprint, revised ed.). BRILL. ISBN 978-9004282483.
- Baulch, Bob; Truong Thi Kim Chuyen; Haughton, Dominique; Haughton, Jonathan (May 2002). "Ethnic Minority Development in Vietnam –A Socioeconomic Perspective" (PDF). Policy Research Working Paper. The World Bank–Development Research Group. WPS 2836.
- Brindley, Erica (2015). Ancient China and the Yue: Perceptions and Identities on the Southern Frontier, C.400 BCE-50 CE. Cambridge University Press. ISBN 978-1107084780.
- Buttinger, Joseph (1958). The Smaller Dragon: A Political History of Vietnam. Praeger Publishers.
- Buttinger, Joseph (1968). Vietnam: A Political History. Praeger.
- Chang, Pao-min (1999). "Corruption and Crime in China: Old Problems and New Trends". The Journal of East Asian Affairs. 13 (1). Institute for National Security Strategy: 221–268. JSTOR 23257220.
- Chang, Pao-min (1982). "The Sino-Vietnamese Dispute over the Ethnic Chinese". The China Quarterly. 90 (90). Cambridge University Press on behalf of the School of Oriental and African Studies: 195–230. doi:10.1017/S030574100000031X. JSTOR 653567. S2CID 154819711.
- Chapuis, Oscar (1995). A History of Vietnam: From Hong Bang to Tu Duc. Greenwood Press. ISBN 0-313-29622-7.
- Chen, King C. (1987). China's War With Vietnam, 1979: Issues, Decisions, and Implications. Hoover Press. ISBN 0817985727.
- Chew Chye Lay, Grace (January 2010). "The Hoa of Phu Quoc in Vietnam: Local Institutions, Education, and Studying Mandarin". Journal of Chinese Overseas. 6 (2): 311–332. doi:10.1163/179325410X526140.
- Chua, Amy L. (1998). "Markets, Democracy, and Ethnicity: Toward A New Paradigm For Law and Development". The Yale Law Journal. 108 (1): 1–107. doi:10.2307/797471. JSTOR 797471.
- Chua, Amy (2003). World on Fire. Knopf Doubleday Publishing. ISBN 978-0385721868. Page: 33 & 34. Wikipedia: World on Fire: How Exporting Free Market Democracy Breeds Ethnic Hatred and Global Instability
- Chua, Amy (2018). Political Tribes: Group Instinct and the Fate of Nations. Penguin Press. ISBN 978-0399562853.
- Cima, Ronald J. (1987). Vietnam: A Country Study. United States Library of Congress. ISBN 978-0160181436.
- Cœdès, George (1966). The Making of South East Asia. University of California Press. ISBN 978-0-520-05061-7.
- Cœdès, George (1968). The Indianized States of South-East Asia (3rd ed.). University of Hawaii Press. ISBN 082480368X.
- Cooke, Nola; Li, Tana (2004). Water Frontier: Commerce and the Chinese in the Lower Mekong Region, 1750–1880. Rowman & Littlefield. ISBN 0742530833.
- Cooke, Nola; Li, Tana; Anderson, James, eds. (2011). The Tongking Gulf Through History (illustrated ed.). University of Pennsylvania Press. ISBN 978-0812243369.
- Cuong Tu Nguyen (1997). Zen in Medieval Vietnam: A Study and Translation of the Thiền Uyển Tập Anh. University of Hawaii Press. ISBN 978-0-8248-1948-4.
- Deepak, Singh (1998). "Socio-Economic Background of the Hoa People" (PDF). Ethnic minorities in Vietnam: a case study of the HOA people (Thesis). hdl:10603/17359 – via Shodhganga.
- Dutton, George; Werner, Jayne; Whitmore, John K., eds. (2012). Sources of Vietnamese Tradition. Introduction to Asian Civilizations. Columbia University Press. ISBN 978-0-231-13862-8.
- Fitzgerald, C. P. (1972). The Southern Expansion of the Chinese People. Barrie & Jenkins.
- Gernet, Jacques (1996). A History of Chinese Civilization (2nd, illustrated, revised, reprint ed.). Cambridge University Press. ISBN 0521497817.
- Gibney, Matthew J.; Hansen, Randall (30 June 2005). Immigration and Asylum: From 1900 to the Present. ABC-CLIO. p. 664. ISBN 1576077969. "hoa refugee -wikipedia."
- Hall, Kenneth R., ed. (2008). Secondary Cities and Urban Networking in the Indian Ocean Realm, C. 1400–1800. Comparative urban studies. Vol. 1. Lexington Books. ISBN 978-0-7391-2835-0.
- Hall, Kenneth R. (2010). A History of Early Southeast Asia: Maritime Trade and Societal Development, 100–1500 (illustrated ed.). Rowman & Littlefield Publishers. ISBN 978-0742567627.
- Heng, Derek (2009). Sino-Malay Trade and Diplomacy from the Tenth Through the Fourteenth Century. Ohio University Press. ISBN 978-0-89680-271-1.
- Higham, Charles (1996). The Bronze Age of Southeast Asia. Cambridge University Press. ISBN 0-521-56505-7.
- Holmgren, Jennifer (1980). Chinese Colonization of Northern Vietnam: Administrative Geography and Political Development in the Tonking Delta, First To Sixth Centuries A.D. Australian National University Press.
- Hyunh, Kim Khanh (1986). Vietnamese Communism, 1925–1945. Cornell University Press. ISBN 978-0801493973.
- Jamieson, Neil L (1995). Understanding Vietnam. University of California Press. ISBN 9780520201576.
- Kelley, Liam C. (2013). "Tai Words and the Place of the Tai in the Vietnamese Past". The Journal of the Siam Society. 101 – via ResearchGate.
- Kelley, Liam C. "Constructing Local Narratives: Spirits, Dreams, and Prophecies in the Medieval Red River Delta". In Anderson & Whitmore (2014), pp. 78–106.
- Khánh Trần (1993). The Ethnic Chinese and Economic Development in Vietnam. Institute of Southeast Asian Studies. ISBN 9789813016675.
- Kiernan, Ben (2019). Việt Nam: a history from earliest time to the present. Oxford University Press. ISBN 978-0-190-05379-6.
- Kim, Nam; Lai Van Toi; Trinh Hoang Hiep (2010). "Co Loa: an investigation of Vietnam's ancient capital". Antiquity. 84 (326): 1011–1027. doi:10.1017/S0003598X00067041. S2CID 162065918.
- Kim, Nam C. (2015). The Origins of Ancient Vietnam. Oxford University Press. ISBN 978-0-199-98089-5.
- Kleeman, Terry F. (1998). Ta Chʻeng, Great Perfection – Religion and Ethnicity in a Chinese Millennial Kingdom. University of Hawaii Press. ISBN 0-8248-1800-8.
- Lai, H. Mark (2004). On Becoming Chinese American: A History of Communities and Institutions. Rowman Altamira. ISBN 0759104581.
- Lam, Tom (2000). "The Exodus of Hoa Refugees from Vietnam and their Settlement in Guangxi: China's Refugee Settlement Strategies". Journal of Refugee Studies. 13 (4): 374–390. doi:10.1093/jrs/13.4.374.
- Largo, V. (2002). Vietnam: Current Issues and Historical Background. Nova Science. ISBN 978-1590333686.
- Lary, Diana, ed. (2007). The Chinese State at the Borders (illustrated ed.). UBC Press. ISBN 978-0774813334.
- Li, Tana (1998). Southeast Asia Program (ed.). Nguyễn Cochinchina: Southern Vietnam in the Seventeenth and Eighteenth Centuries. Volume 23 of Studies on Southeast Asia (illustrated ed.). SEAP Publications. ISBN 978-0-87727-722-4.
- Li, Tana (15 February 2006). "A View from the Sea: Perspectives on the Northern and Central Vietnamese Coast". Journal of Southeast Asian Studies. 37 (1): 83–102. doi:10.1017/S0022463405000433. S2CID 155069624.
- Li, Tana (2010). "3: The Ming Factor and the Emergence of the Viet in the 15th Century". In Geoff Wade; Sun Laichen (eds.). Southeast Asia in the Fifteenth Century: The China Factor. Hong Kong University Press. pp. 83–103. ISBN 978-988-8028-48-1.
- Li, Tana (28–29 June 2012). Epidemics in late pre-modern Vietnam and their links with her neighbours 1. Imperial China and Its Southern Neighbours. Singapore: Institute of Southeast Asian Studies.
- Li, Tana (2015). "8 Epidemics, Trade, and Local Worship in Vietnam, Leizhou peninsula, and Hainan island". In Mair, Victor H.; Kelley, Liam (eds.). Imperial China and Its Southern Neighbours (illustrated, reprint ed.). Flipside Digital Content Company Inc. ISBN 978-981-4620-54-3.
- Logan, William Stewart (2000). Hanoi: Biography of a City. UNSW Press. ISBN 0868404438.
- MacKerras, Colin (2003). Ethnicity in Asia. Routledge-Curzon. ISBN 0415258170.
- Marr, David G.; White, Christine Pelzer (1988). Postwar Vietnam: Dilemmas in Socialist Development. Issue 3 of Southeast Asia Program Series. SEAP Publications. ISBN 0877271208.
- Marr, David G. (2010). "Vietnamese, Chinese, and Overseas Chinese during the Chinese Occupation of Northern Indochina (1945–1946)". Chinese Southern Diaspora Studies. 4: 129–139.
- McLeod, Mark; Nguyen, Thi Dieu (30 June 2001). Culture and Customs of Vietnam. Greenwood. ISBN 978-0-313-36113-5.
- Miksic, John Norman; Yian, Goh Geok (2016). Ancient Southeast Asia. Routledge. ISBN 978-0415735544.
- Murphey, Rhoads (1997). East Asia: A New History. Pearson. ISBN 978-0205695225.
- Nguyen, Ba Khoach (1980). "Phung Nguyen". Asian Perspectives. 23 (1): 23–54.
- O'Harrow, Stephen (1979). "From Co-loa to the Trung Sisters' Revolt: Viet-Nam as the Chinese Found It". Asian Perspectives. 22 (2): 140–164. JSTOR 42928006.
- Richter, Frank-Jürgen (1999). Business Networks in Asia: Promises, Doubts, and Perspectives. Praeger. ISBN 978-1567203028.
- Santasombat, Yos (2017). Chinese Capitalism in Southeast Asia: Cultures and Practices. Palgrave Macmillan. ISBN 978-9811046957.
- Share, Michael (Fall 1994). "The Chinese Community in South Vietnam During the Second Indochina War". Journal of Third World Studies. 11 (2). Association of Third World Studies Inc.: 240–265. ISSN 2335-6677. JSTOR 45197490. ProQuest 1303272229.
- Shin, Leo K. "5. Ming China and Its Border with Annam". In Lary (2007).
- Stratton, Eric (2002). Evolution of Indian Stupa Architecture in East Asia (illustrated ed.). Vedams eBooks. ISBN 8179360067.
- Suryadinata, Leo (1997). Ethnic Chinese As Southeast Asians. Institute of Southeast Asian Studies. ISBN 978-9813055506.
- Suryadinata, Leo (2012). Southeast Asian Personalities of Chinese Descent: A Biographical Dictionary. Institute of Southeast Asian Studies. ISBN 9789814345217.
- Taylor, Keith (1980). "An Evaluation of the Chinese Period in Vietnamese History". The Journal of Asiatic Studies. 23 (1).
- Taylor, Keith Weller (1983). The Birth of Vietnam. University of California Press. ISBN 978-0-520-07417-0.
- Taylor, Keith Weller (2013). A History of the Vietnamese. Cambridge University Press. ISBN 978-0-521-87586-8.
- Taylor, Keith Weller; Whitmore, John K., eds. (1995). Essays into Vietnamese Pasts. SEAP Publications. ISBN 0877277184.
- Taylor, Philip (2007). Cham Muslims of the Mekong Delta: place and mobility in the cosmopolitan periphery. NUS Press. ISBN 978-9971-69-361-9.
- Tetsudosho (1917). An Official Guide to Eastern Asia: East Indies. Vol. 5. Imperial Japanese Government Railways.
- Tong, Chee Kiong (2010). Identity and Ethnic Relations in Southeast Asia: Racializing Chineseness. Springer. ISBN 978-9048189083.
- Tsai, Shih-Shan Henry (1996). The Eunuchs in the Ming Dynasty (Ming Tai Huan Kuan) (illustrated ed.). SUNY Press. ISBN 0791426874.
- Tucker, Spencer (1999). Vietnam. University of Kentucky Press. ISBN 978-0813121215.
- Ungar, E. S. (Winter 1987–1988). "The Struggle Over the Chinese Community in Vietnam, 1946–1986". Pacific Affairs. 60 (4). University of British Columbia Press: 596–614. doi:10.2307/2759185. JSTOR 2759185. ProQuest 1301429844.
- Wade, Geoff (2005), Southeast Asia in the Ming Shi-lu: an open access resource, Asia Research Institute and the Singapore E-Press, National University of Singapore
- West, Barbara A. (2009). Encyclopedia of the Peoples of Asia and Oceania. Facts on File. ISBN 978-0816071098. eBook: ISBN 978-1438119137.
- Whitmore, John K. "Chapter 6 Vân Đồn, the 'Mạc Gap,' and the End of the Jiaozhi Ocean System: Trade and State in Đại Việt, Circa 1450–1550". In Cooke, Li & Anderson (2011).
- Wicks, Robert S. (1992). Money, markets, and trade in early Southeast Asia: the development of indigenous monetary systems to AD 1400. SEAP Publications. p. 215. ISBN 0-87727-710-9.
- Vo, Nhan Tri (1990). Vietnam's Economic Policy Since 1975. Institute of Southeast Asian Studies. ISBN 978-9813035546.
- Walker, Hugh Dyson (2012). East Asia: A New History. AuthorHouse. ISBN 978-1477265161.
- Yu, Ying-shih (1986). "Han foreign relations". In Twitchett, Denis C.; Fairbank, John King (eds.). The Cambridge History of China: Volume 1, The Ch'in and Han Empires, 221 BC–AD 220. Cambridge: Cambridge University Press. pp. 377–463.

=== Chinese ===
- Huang, Lan Xiang (黃蘭翔) (December 2004). "華人聚落在越南的深植與變遷: 以會安為例" [The Deepening and Changes of Chinese Settlements in Vietnam: Taking Hoi An as an Example] (PDF). Topic Study II: Vietnam (in Chinese). Research Center for Humanities and Social Sciences, Academica Sinica. Archived from the original (PDF) on 1 August 2013.
- Lee, Qingxin (李庆新) (30 November 2010). "越南明香与明乡社" [Vietnam Mingxiang and Mingxiang Society] (PDF) (in Chinese). 广东 广州 [Guangzhou, Guangdong]: 广东省社会科学院 历史研究所 [Institute of History, Guangdong Academy of Social Sciences]. Archived from the original (PDF) on 12 August 2011.

=== Vietnamese ===
- Xuân Kính Nguyễn; Hồng Lý Lê; Quang Trọng Võ (2007). Thông báo văn hoá dân gian 2006 (in Vietnamese). Vietnam: Nhà xuá̂t bản Khoa học xa̋ hội.
- Đào Duy Anh (2016) [1964]. Đất nước Việt Nam qua các đời: nghiên cứu địa lý học lịch sử Việt Nam (in Vietnamese). Nha Nam. ISBN 978-604-94-8700-2.
- Ngô Sĩ Liên (1993). Đại Việt sử ký toàn thư (in Vietnamese) (Nội các quan bản ed.). Hanoi: Social Science Publishing House.
