= Gia Huy Phong =

German footballer

Personal information
- Date of birth: 5 February 2004 (age 22)
- Place of birth: Berlin, Germany
- Height: 1.84 m (6 ft 0 in)
- Positions: Left back; left midfielder

Team information
- Current team: Optik Rathenow
- Number: 17

Youth career
- –2016: Frohnauer
- 2016–2018: Hertha BSC
- 2018–2019: Tennis Borussia Berlin
- 2019–2022: Wolfsburg
- 2022–2023: Viktoria Berlin

Senior career*
Years	Team	Apps	(Gls)
2023–2025	Viktoria Berlin	24	(1)
2025–	Optik Rathenow	20	(1)
- * Club domestic league appearances and goals as of 3 April 2026

Gia Huy Phong (born 5 February 2004) is a German footballer who plays as a left back or left midfielder for Optik Rathenow.

== Early life ==
Phong was born in Berlin from Vietnamese parents. His father is a Hoa ethnic from Đồng Nai and his mother is from Khánh Hòa.

== Early career ==
Phong started his career at the youth side of the Berlin based team Frohnauer before joining the youth academy region giants Hertha BSC in 2016. He was released by the club in 2018 and joined Tennis Borussia Berlin before signing for Wolfsburg youth team. He appeared in 3 group stage games during the 2021–22 UEFA Youth League as his team failed to reach the next stage.

== Club career ==
In June 2022, Phong joined Viktoria Berlin. He was promoted to the first team for the 2023–24 season. On 30 July 2023, he made his Regionalliga Nordost debut in a 2–1 win against Energie Cottbus. He scored his first career goal on 11 November 2023 against Hertha BSC II, the only goal of the 1–0 win.
