= Hoa people in Ho Chi Minh City =

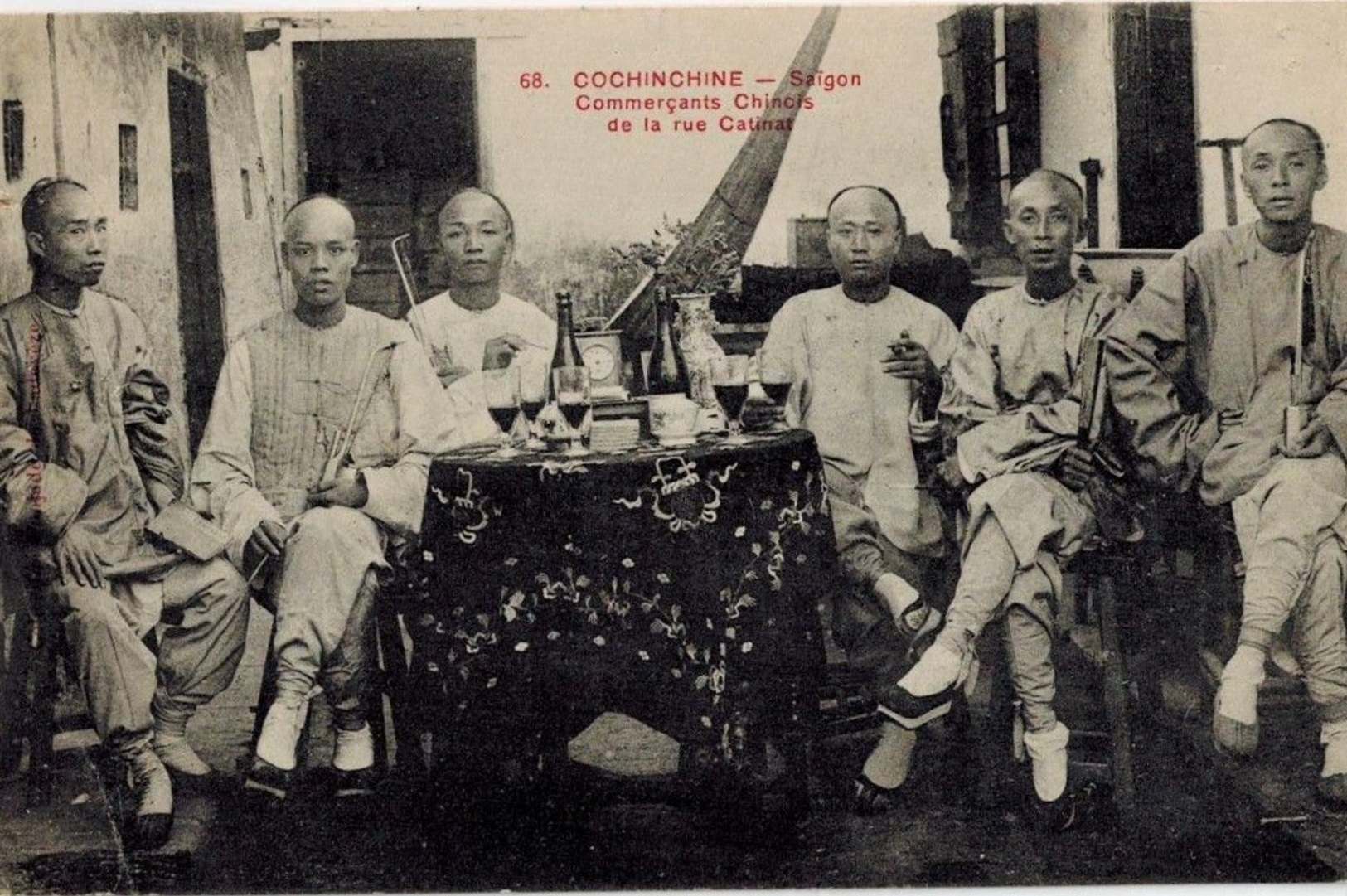
Hoa people in Saigon, early 20th century

The Hoa people in Ho Chi Minh City number about 500,000. They live mainly in Cho Lon (District 5, District 6, District 10 and District 11), which is seen as a local Chinatown. As of 2010, the Hoa people population accounted for just 7% of the city's population, but its members owned around 30% of the city's privately held enterprises. Many of these enterprises are successful companies such as Binh Tien, Thai Tuan and Kinh Do.

Before the Fall of Saigon, Chinese Businessmen played a very important role in the economic and political life of the Republic of Vietnam, as they maintained excellent relationships with the government. After the Vietnam War, especially after the Sino-Vietnamese War in 1979, many Chinese returned to China, fled to other parts of Southeast Asia, or emigrated to the United States and Canada, along with other Western countries .

== See also ==
- Jade Emperor Pagoda
- Quan Âm Pagoda
- Thien Hau Temple
- Hoa
