= 1782 Saigon massacre =

Saigon massacre
- Location: Saigon, modern-day Ho Chi Minh City
- Date: 1782
- Target: Chinese
- Deaths: 4,000–20,000
- Injuries: Unknown
- Perpetrator: The Vietnamese Tây Sơn forces under Nguyễn Nhạc

The 1782 Saigon Massacre was a massacre of ethnic Chinese carried out by the Vietnamese Tây Sơn rebels under the leadership of Nguyễn Nhạc in 1782 in the city of Saigon, which is modern-day Ho Chi Minh City.

During the early phase of the Vietnamese civil war of 1771–1802, many Chinese formed a military group called the Hoà Nghĩa army that fought for the Nguyen lord who was the Tây Sơn's enemy. In 1782 the Tây Sơn led by Nguyễn Nhạc launched an attack on Saigon and succeeded in capturing the city. However, one of Nhạc's key lieutenants was killed by an ethnic Chinese general fighting for the Nguyen. Nhạc decided to clean out Chinese settlers in Saigon. Tây Sơn troops burned and pillaged the shops of Chinese merchants and massacred thousands of Chinese residents. This was more generally reflected by Tây Sơn's anger at the increasing support given by the Chinese community to their Nguyen rivals. After this victory, the Tây Sơn leaders returned north in June, leaving the city in the hands of their lieutenants. Estimates of the Chinese civilian death toll range from 4,000 to 20,000.

== Bibliography ==
- Dutton, George Edson (2006). The Tây Sơn uprising: society and rebellion in eighteenth-century Vietnam. University of Hawaii Press. ISBN 0-8248-2984-0.
- Choi, Byung Wook (2004). Southern Vietnam Under the Reign of Minh Mạng (1820-1841): Central Policies and Local Response. SEAP Publications. ISBN 978-0-87727-138-3.
- Trần, Khánh (1993). The Ethnic Chinese and Economic Development in Vietnam. Institute of Southeast Asian Studies. ISBN 9789813016668.
