= Jack Lee (chef) =

Vietnamese-American celebrity chef

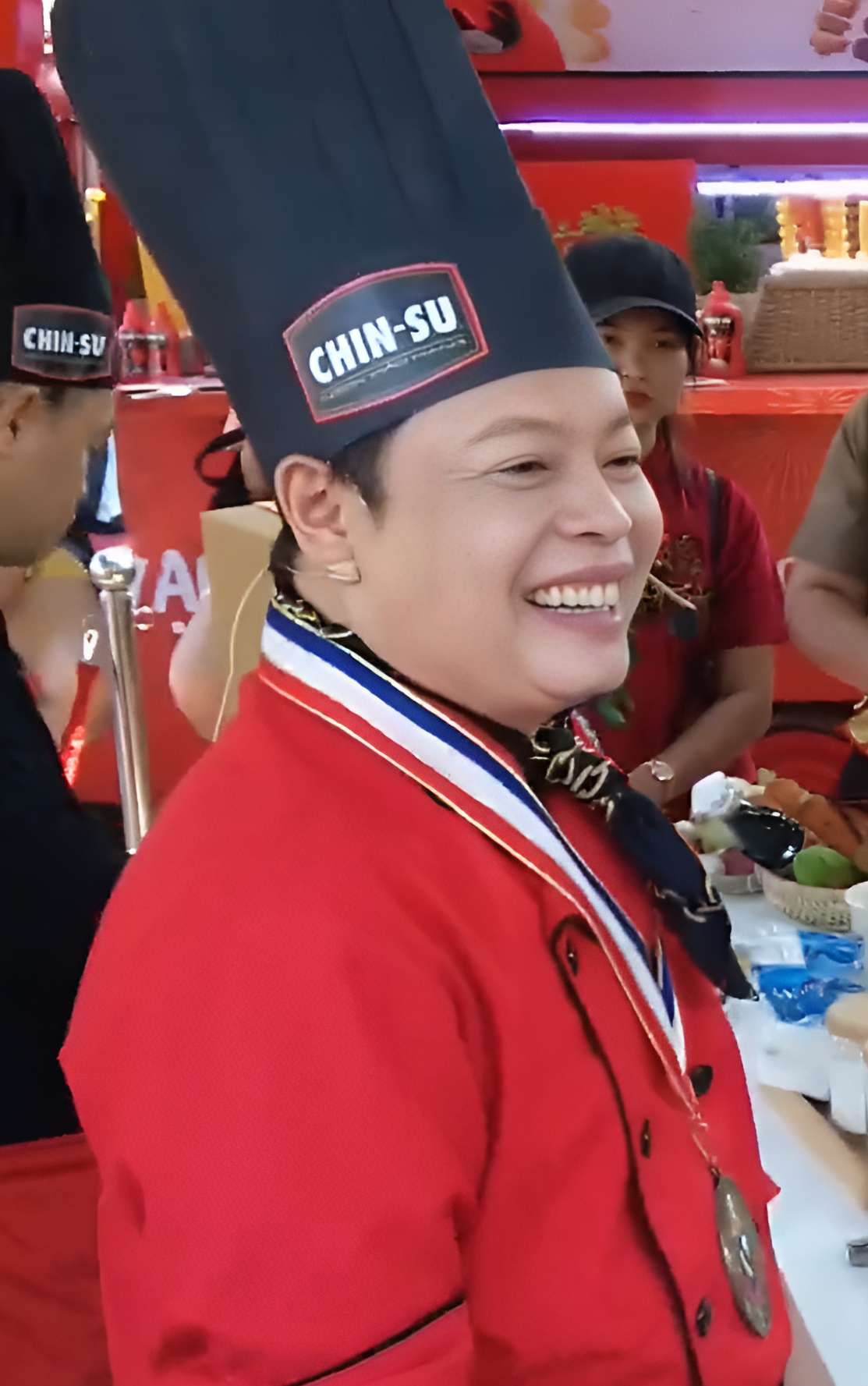
- Jack Lee in 2020
- Born: Lý Vinh Viễn; 1970 (age 55–56); Saigon, South Vietnam
- Occupations: celebrity chef, goodwill ambassador
- Years active: 2006–present
- Known for: Catering to numerous Hollywood A-list celebrities
- Notable work: $100 Egg Roll
- Television: Rachael vs. Guy: Kids Cook-Off, Cutthroat Kitchen, Masterchef Junior Vietnam, Món Ăn Của Ngôi Sao, Thiên Đường Ẩm Thực (cuisine paradise), Chuẩn Cơm Mẹ Nấu, Celebrity MasterChef Vietnam
- Spouse: Liza Abella Lee
- Children: Andrew Lee, Angela Lee
- Mother: Quach Tran Mieu
- Website: chefjacklee.com

Jack Lee (Lý Vinh Viễn) is an American celebrity chef of Chinese descent based in Ho Chi Minh City, Vietnam. He is often referred to in Vietnamese media as đầu bếp Hollywood (the Hollywood chef) or đầu bếp của ngôi sao (chef to the stars) in recognition of his background as private caterer for numerous Hollywood celebrities in the United States, which by association has advanced his public profile in Vietnam. At the height of his career while based in America, he was the executive chef of Baroness Kimberly Moore's Echelon Club, a charitable lifestyle organization for high-profile individuals in Hollywood, and banquet chef at the Hotel Bel-Air. He has featured on a number of television series both in Vietnam and the United States, including Rachael vs. Guy: Kids Cook-Off;, Cutthroat Kitchen, Food of the Stars and Food Paradise. He is currently appearing as a judge on Junior MasterChef Vietnam as well as Vietnam’s version of My Mom Cooks Better Than Yours on state-owned channel VTV3 and is also filming for the Asian Food Channel. He has been promoting Netspace Culinary Academy in Vietnam with celebrity chef Anna Olson and is a goodwill ambassador for the culinary charity K.O.T.O. (teaching employable food industry skills to Vietnamese street children). In 2018, the prominent Vietnamese-language magazine The Thao Van Hoa named Jack Lee Chef of the Year.

== Background ==
Lee was born in Cho Lon (Chinatown of Ho Chi Minh City) in 1970 to a Chinese family who immigrated to Vietnam . At the age of 10, he left the city with his family as a refugee and became one of the Vietnamese boat people, eventually settling in California. During his youth, Lee learned English by watching episodes the popular sitcom Three’s Company strongly identifying with the TV character Jack Tripper, a chef played by actor John Ritter. Interviews with Lee have frequently focussed on his crediting this show as being his motivation for choosing a career as a chef, as well as his English name.

== Career ==
Jack Lee graduated from the California School of Culinary Art under the Le Cordon Bleu Program. While studying, he undertook a voluntary position at the Hotel Bel-Air, and was eventually permitted to work as a trainee chef until securing a paid position as Banquet Chef. Training under Humberto Contreras, he studied the French-Californian tradition commonly associated with the hotel. It was during this time that he experimented with bringing the tastes and cooking techniques of his childhood to gourmet Western dishes, creating a fusion cuisine that formed the basis of his subsequent career in catering.

After managing the Hotel Bel-Air’s culinary program and catering for a number of celebrity events (such as the Million Dollar Baby Oscar Party), he started his own catering firm, Chinoise Cuisine. The firm continued to cater for high-profile events such as the Oscars and Golden Globes as well as culinary events for celebrities and at private parties.

=== Tasting collections ===
Inspired by the intricate plating techniques he had studied at the Hotel Bel-Air, Lee began to explore gourmet cuisine as an art form and subsequently went on to release a series of tasting collections at invitation-only events, exhibiting each dish in the same way a visual artist would present a body of artworks.

=== $100 Egg Roll ===
As a response to the premium-value dishes he had often served at celebrity events (such as the $5,000 hamburger), Lee released a gourmet version of a simple Vietnamese snack to demonstrate the 'haute cuisine' potential of Asian cooking. This was the $100 Egg Roll.

The first version of the $100 Egg Roll was announced in August 2011. After being publicly criticised for the use of shark fin, Lee issued a public apology and revised his recipe to include Maine lobster tail and Alaskan king crab as a replacement. The egg roll was topped with Sevruga caviar and gold leaf, and paired with a fresh raspberry and Sauvignon Blanc reduction dipping sauce. The egg rolls were routinely served with Dom Perignon champagne.
