= East–West Highway (Ho Chi Minh City) =

Road in Ho Chi Minh City, Vietnam

- Đại lộ Đông – Tây
- Võ Văn Kiệt – Mai Chí Thọ Highway
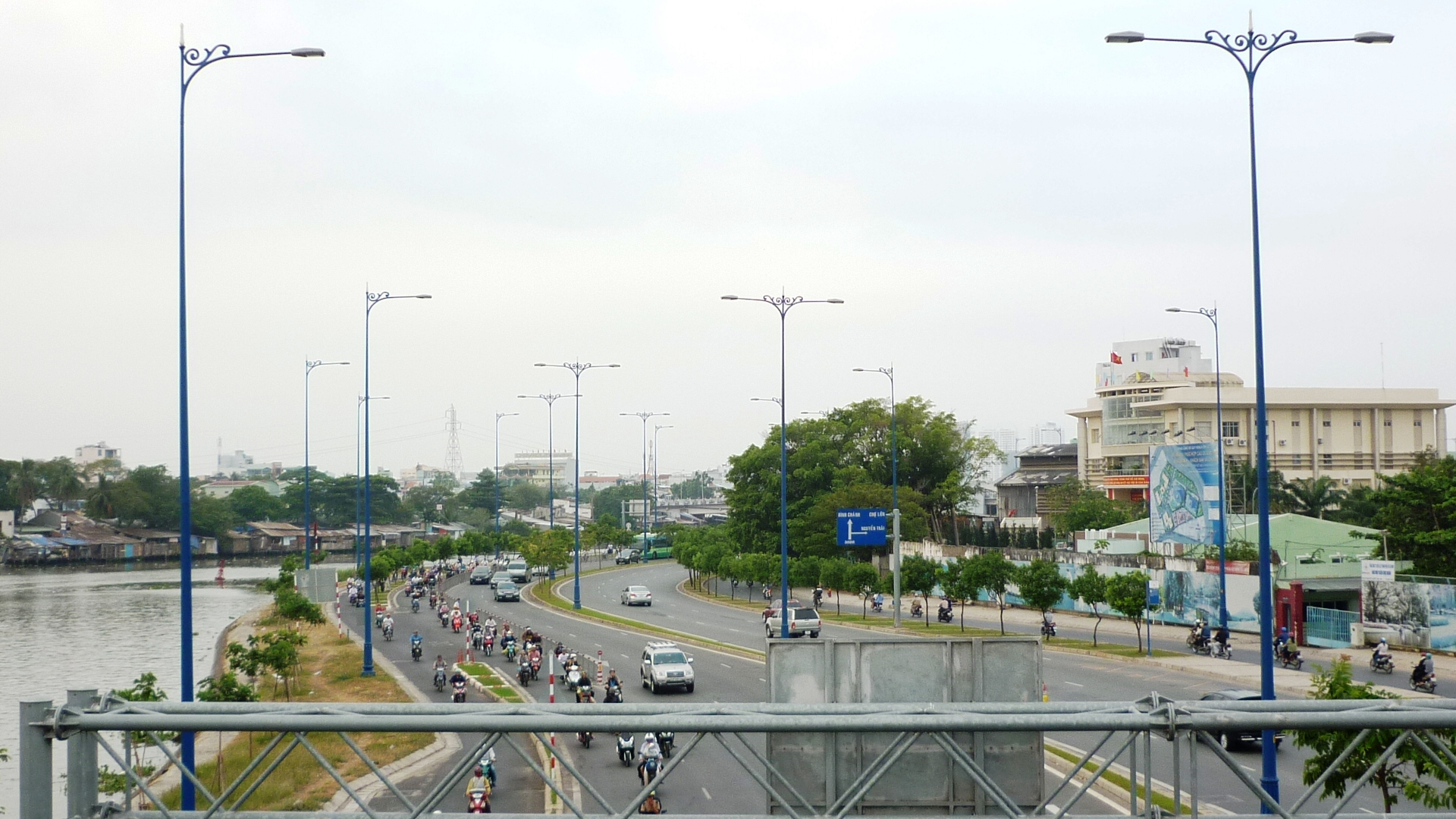
- View of Võ Văn Kiệt Boulevard from Nguyễn Văn Cừ Bridge

Route information
- Length: 21.9 km (13.6 mi)
- Existed: 2011–present

Major junctions
- East end: at Cát Lái interchange, Bình Trưng, Ho Chi Minh City
- at An Phú interchange, Bình Trưng, Ho Chi Minh City
- West end: at Tân Kiên interchange, Tân Nhựt, Ho Chi Minh City

Location
- Country: Vietnam
- Divisions: An Khánh, Bình Trưng, Bến Thành, Cầu Ông Lãnh, Chợ Quán, An Đông, Chợ Lớn, Bình Tiên, Bình Phú, Phú Định, An Lạc and Tân Nhựt commune

Highway system
- Transport in Vietnam

East–West Highway (Vietnamese: Đại lộ Đông – Tây) or Võ Văn Kiệt – Mai Chí Thọ Highway (Vietnamese: Đại lộ Võ Văn Kiệt – Mai Chí Thọ), is a major throughfare that runs through the center of Ho Chi Minh City, restored and upgraded from the existed route, and a new route will be constructed to create a new east–west access axis to and from the south, aiming to reduce traffic congestion on the Saigon Bridge and other main arteries in the city. This throughfare meets the traffic requirements for the city's ports to destinations in the Northeast–Southwest direction and the Mekong Delta provinces, creating a traffic axis to Thủ Thiêm, and improving the environment along the canal it passes through, enhancing the city's aesthetics.

== Location ==
The highway starts at the west from National Route 1A in Tân Kiên, Bình Chánh District, crosses the Nước Lên Canal by the same name bridge then crosses the Nhảy Canal by Rạch Cây Bridge and Lò Gốm Canal by the same name bridge. From the Rạch Cây Bridge, it runs along the Ruột Ngựa Canal and Tàu Hủ – Bến Nghé Canal to the Yersin – Chương Dương T-intersection near Calmette Bridge in Bến Thành, District 1; crosses the Saigon River via the Thủ Thiêm Tunnel and connects to Hanoi Highway at Cát Lái T-Junction in An Phú, Thủ Đức. The total length is 21.9 km, passing through the former districts are: District 1, 5, 6, 8, Bình Tân, Bình Chánh District, and Thủ Đức City (previously District 2, Ho Chi Minh City), forming an East–West transportation axis and connecting the northeastern and southwestern ends of the city. The East–West Highway facilitates traffic access to and from Saigon Port and from there to the southeastern and western provinces without having to go through the city center. This is a vital artery closely linking localities in the Southern key economic region.

== Main construction ==
=== Thủ Thiêm Tunnel ===
Thủ Thiêm Tunnel was constructed using immersed tunnel technology. The tunnel is 1,490 meters long and 33 meters wide, accommodating 6 lanes of traffic. The structure consists of 4 tunnel sections, each 370 meters long, cast in a casting basin at Nhơn Trạch district, Đồng Nai, then towed along the river to the construction site to be submerged to the bottom of the Saigon River.

=== Other items ===
- Interchange with National Route 1 at Tân Kiên interchange, Bình Chánh District.
- Interchange with Hanoi Highway at Cát Lái T-Junction, Thủ Đức.
- Toll plaza (dismantled).

=== Basic specifications ===
- Total length of the route: 21.89 km
- Length of the Thủ Thiêm Tunnel alone: 1.49 km
- Road width: 70 m (National Route 1 to Lò Gốm Bridge section), 50 m (Lò Gốm Bridge to west entrance of Thủ Thiêm Tunnel section) and 140 m (section in Thủ Đức)
- Lanes: 9-10 lanes (route in west Saigon River bank), 12 lanes (in Thủ Đức)
- Total investment: over 13,400 billion VND (As of 2010, due to the need to increase capital by more than 3,600 billion VND to expand further in Thủ Đức)
- Milestones: Construction began on January 31, 2005; Phase 1 (West Bank of Saigon River section) opened to traffic on September 2, 2009; the entire route opened to traffic on November 20, 2011, coinciding with the opening of the Thủ Thiêm Tunnel.

=== Route information ===
- Võ Văn Kiệt Boulevard: 10 lanes (stretch from National Route 1 to Lò Gốm Bridge), 9 lanes (stretch from Lò Gốm Bridge to Thủ Thiêm Tunnel entrance).
- Mai Chí Thọ Boulevard: 12 lanes.

=== Bridges and tunnel ===
- Nước Lên Bridge: 8 làn xe.
- Rạch Cây Bridge: 10 làn xe.
- Lò Gốm Bridge: 8 làn xe.
- Thủ Thiêm Tunnel: 6 làn xe.
- Canal Bridge No. 1 (Cầu Kênh 1): 12 làn xe.
- Canal Bridge No. 2 (Cầu Kênh 2): 12 làn xe.
- Cá Trê Lớn Bridge: 12 làn xe.
- Cá Trê Nhỏ Bridge: 12 làn xe.

=== Overpasses ===
- National Route 1 Overpass: 8 lanes
- Chà Và Bridge
- Nguyễn Tri Phương Bridge
- Y-shape Bridge (Cầu Chữ Y)
- Nguyễn Văn Cừ Bridge
- Ông Lãnh Bridge
- Calmette Bridge
- Mống Bridge
- Khánh Hội Bridge
- 2 branches of the Cát Lái overpass: 2 lanes

== History ==
=== Construction process ===
==== Project planning ====
Feasibility studies for the project have been underway since 1997. The project plan was developed between January and September of 1999 by the consulation of SAPROF (Special Assistance for Project Formation). On July 5, 2000, Prime Minister issued Decision No. 622/QĐ-TTg regarding the approval of investment for the construction project of the East–West Highway in Ho Chi Minh City..

The East–West Highway project has a total investment of 9,864 billion VND. Of that amount, foreign loans totaled VND 6,394 billion from the Japan Bank for International Cooperation (JBIC) and matching funds from the government budget of 3,470 billion VND. On May 2010, The project requires an additional capital increase of approximately 3,600 billion VND due to the expansion design in Thủ Đức, bringing the total investment to over 13,400 billion VND.

==== Clearance ====
Ho Chi Minh City has carried out land compensation and clearance over the past four years, involving 6,754 households and 368 organizations, covering a total area of 201.63 hectares.

On September 2, 2009, the 13.4 km section of the highway from Chương Dương Quay (near the Saigon River bank in District 1) to National Route 1 (Bình Chánh District) was opened to traffic.

=== Names ===
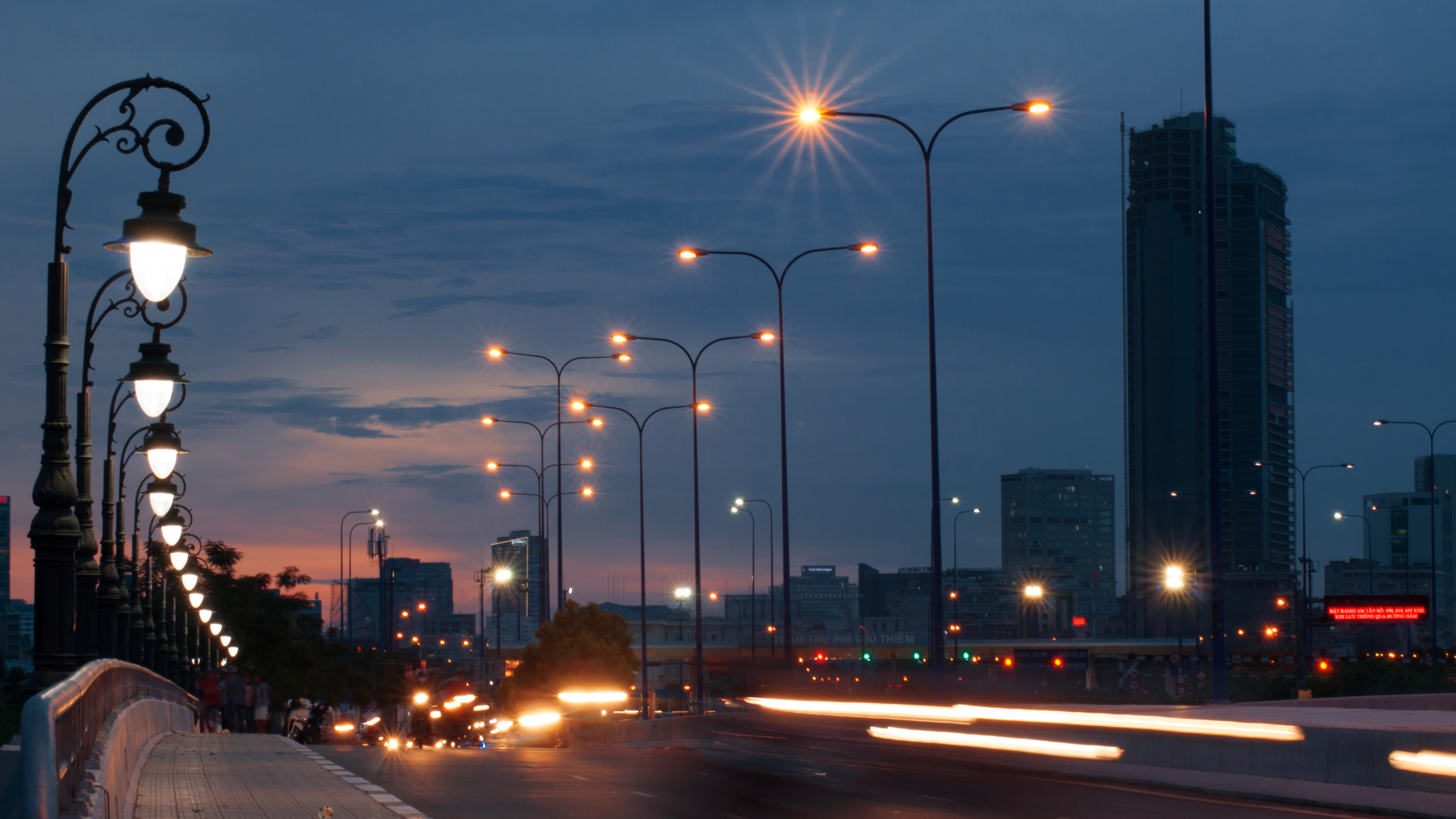
Mai Chí Thọ Boulevard

On April 21, 2011, the People's Committee of Ho Chi Minh City issued Decision No. 2030/QD-UBND naming the section of road from the west bank of the Saigon River (District 1) to National Route 1 (Bình Chánh district) as Võ Văn Kiệt Boulevard or Võ Văn Kiệt Highway (Vietnamese: Đường Võ Văn Kiệt, Đại lộ Võ Văn Kiệt). Previously, since 1985, the nowadays Võ Văn Kiệt Boulevard was divided into 3 sections with 3 different names are: Chương Dương Quay (Bến Chương Dương), Hàm Tử Quay (Bến Hàm Tử) and Trần Văn Kiểu Road (Đường Trần Văn Kiểu or Bến Trần Văn Kiểu. As it before 1985, this road was called Lê Quang Liêm Quay. When the government changed to Trần Văn Kiểu Road in 1985, yet people still called it with Bến in the name).

On August 8, 2012, According to Decision No. 34/2012/QD-UBND of the People's Committee of Ho Chi Minh City, the road section from the Saigon River tunnel on the District 2 side to the Cát Lái intersection as Mai Chí Thọ Boulevard or Mai Chí Thọ Highway (Vietnamese: Đường Mai Chí Thọ, Đại lộ Mai Chí Thọ). Previously, this throughfare was initially named as Route T13 in the Thủ Thiêm Urban Planning.

== Notable areas ==
The highway goes through some notable areas from east to west with some notable landmarks and buildings are:

- Rach Chiec National Sports Complex (groundbroke)
- Thủ Thiêm station
- Thủ Thiêm New Urban Area: Thisofic Tower, Central Political - Administrative - Cultural Center and Central Lake Park, Lotte Eco Smart City, Empire City (Empire 88 Tower), Young Pioneer Palace
- Saigon River Park
- Financial District: Thủ Ngữ Flagpole, IFC One Saigon, State Bank of Vietnam, Region 2 Branch, Ho Chi Minh Stock Exchange
- Cầu Kho: Việt Nga Mall, VICEM Hà Tiên Building, Chương Dương Beverage Headquarters
- Chợ Lớn
  - Chợ Quán: Southern Institute of Water Resources Research, Memorial plaque for the Chợ Quán lighthouse, Hospital for Tropical Diseases and Ho Chi Minh City Psychiatric Hospital (Note: Both hospitals are split from Chợ Quán Hospital)
  - An Đông: Hòa Bình Market, Casino Grande Monde, An Bình Parish – St. Joseph's Church
  - Downtown Chợ Lớn: Building Materials Market (Chợ Vật liệu xây dựng), Chợ Lớn Central Post, Kim Biên Market, Hàng Bàng Channel
  - Bình Tiên: Satra Centre Mall Võ Văn Kiệt
- Phú Định: LaChateau 5-star Hotel, Nguyễn Thị Định High School for Gifted Students in Physical Education and Sports
- An Lạc: White Palace Võ Văn Kiệt Convention Center, Ho Chi Minh City Funeral House
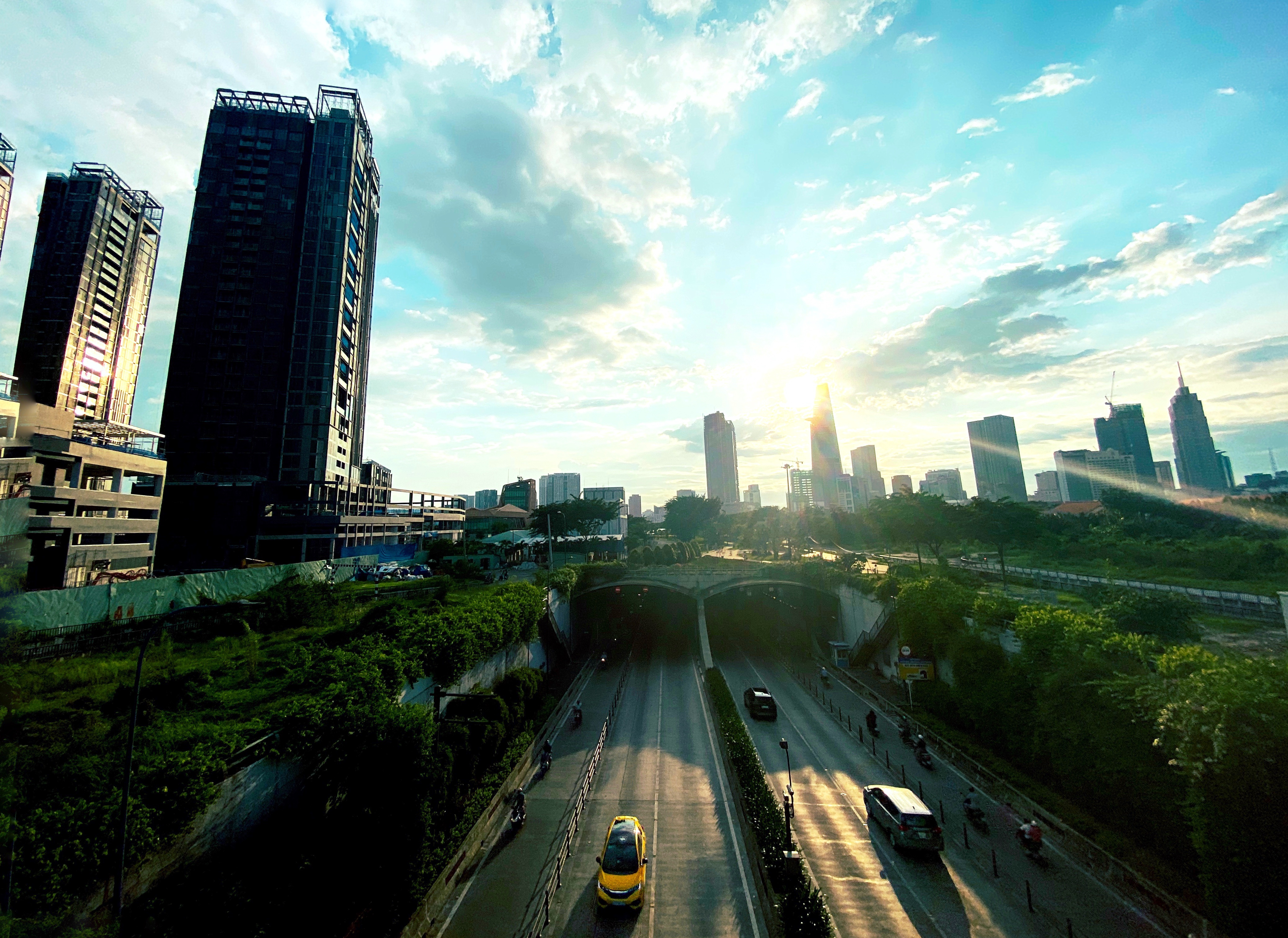
Thủ Thiêm Tunnel east entrance seen from Trần Bạch Đằng Overpass

Financial District

Row of old shophouses in Cầu Ông Lãnh

Tàu Hủ Canal with Bình Đông Quay Flower Market in Phú Định on the left with Võ Văn Kiệt Boulevard on the right

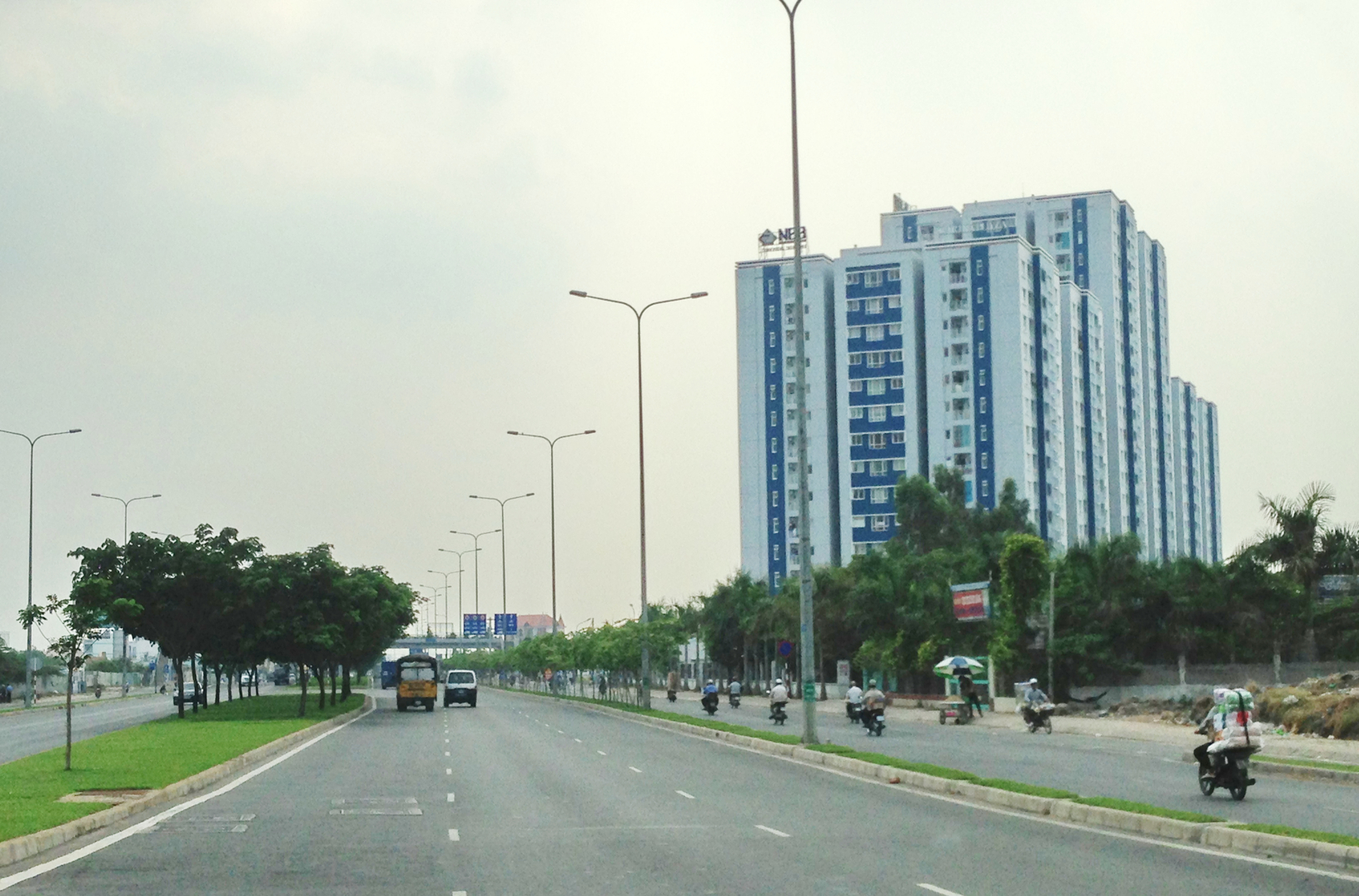
Võ Văn Kiệt Boulevard in Phú Định with apartment buildings

== Benefit ==
East–West Highway is considered a strategic route of Ho Chi Minh City and the most important highlight of the gateway into Thủ Thiêm, this contributes to the decentralization of urban population towards the east bank of the Saigon River and the south of the city, especially for the Thủ Thiêm Commercial District in Thủ Đức and help make this district the new center of the city in the future, as Ho Chi Minh City identifies its development direction as eastward and southward. Another significant value of the East–West Highway is the improvement of the canal-side environment, enhancing the city's aesthetics. Upon completion, the boulevard will replace the slum shacks of 10,000 households on both sides of Tàu Hủ – Bến Nghé Canal will be replaced with green parks, public construction, the relocated households will have a better life and a more civilized living environment. In addition, during the construction of East–West Highway, then existing Chà Và Bridge and Y-shape Bridge (cầu Chữ Y) would have to be demolished and rebuilt to increase the bridge's clearance, allowing vehicles traveling on the East–West Highway to pass underneath. This will also improve the clearance for navigation on the Tàu Hủ – Bến Nghé Canal, thereby facilitating the development of waterway transportation and the economy.

== Allegations of corruption ==
Huỳnh Ngọc Sĩ, the director of the East–West Highway Project Management Board has been temporarily suspended from his duties following allegations of corruption amounting to 2.5 million USD regarding this project, the project leader for the East–West Highway in Ho Chi Minh City has been replaced. The investigation only confirmed that Sĩ had received bribes of80.000 USD and fraudulently renting out private houses to the project team to profit from the difference. On September 25, 2009, the People's Court of Ho Chi Minh City sentenced Sĩ to 3 years in prison for the aforementioned frauds.

== In popular culture ==
East–West Highway was mentioned in the title of "Giữa Đại Lộ Đông Tây" (lit. 'In the middle of East–West Highway'), a famous 2021 Vietnamese song composed by Vietnamese musician Hứa Kim Tuyền in 2018 and was first performed by Vietnamese singer Uyên Linh, the songwriter told that he wrote this song in just 15 minutes, capturing the genuine and poetic emotions and moments of love in the heart of Saigon. However, its official music video for the Uyên Linh's version was filmed in Đà Nẵng.
