= Tân Nhựt =

Tân Nhựt Xã Tân Nhựt
- Commune
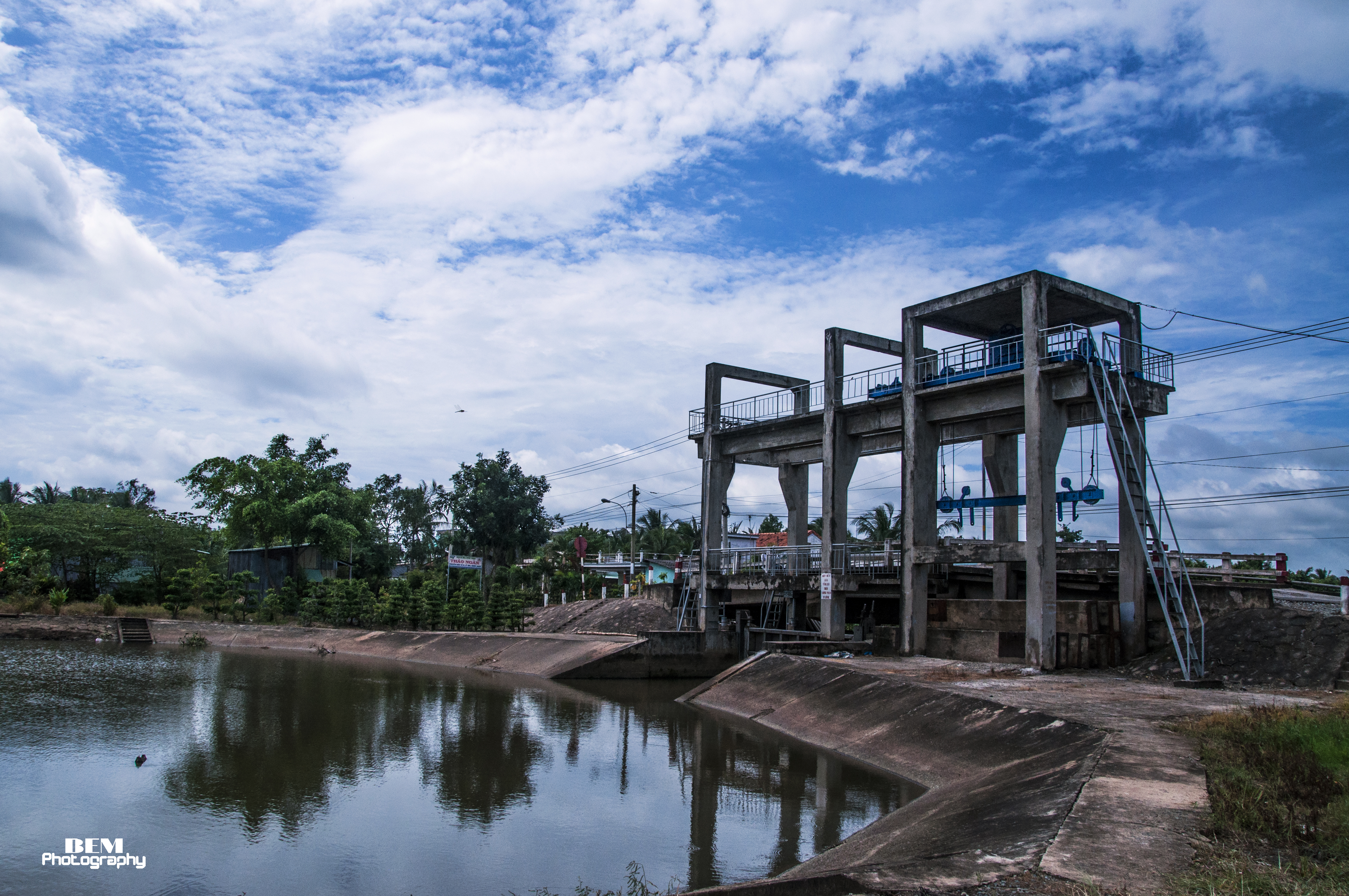
- A body of water in Tân Nhựt
- Interactive map of Tân Nhựt
- Coordinates: 10°42′9.58″N 106°34′16.25″E
- Country: Vietnam
- Municipality: Ho Chi Minh City
- Established: June 16, 2025

Area
  - Total: 16.86 sq mi (43.67 km^{2})

Population (2024)
  - Total: 115,513
  - Density: 6,851/sq mi (2,645/km^{2})
- Time zone: UTC+07:00 (Indochina Time)
- Administrative code: 27595

Tân Nhựt (Vietnamese: Xã Tân Nhựt) is a commune of Ho Chi Minh City, Vietnam. It is one of the 168 new wards, communes and special zones of the city following the reorganization in 2025.

== Geography ==
Tân Nhựt commune is 16 kilometers west of Saigon ward, it is adjacent to the following wards and communes:

- To the east, it borders An Lạc, Phú Định and Bình Đông wards
- To the south, it borders Bình Chánh commune
- To the southwest, it borders Mỹ Yên and Lương Hòa communes of Tây Ninh province
- To the northwest, it borders Bình Lợi commune.

According to Official Dispatch No. 2896/BNV-CQĐP dated May 27, 2025 of the Ministry of Home Affairs, following the merger, Tân Nhựt has a land area of 43.67 km², the population as of December 31, 2024 is 115,513 people, the population density is 2,645 people/km².

== History ==
On June 16, 2025, the National Assembly Standing Committee issued Resolution No. 1685/NQ-UBTVQH15 on the arrangement of commune-level administrative units of Ho Chi Minh City in 2025 (effective from June 16, 2025). Accordingly, the entire land area and population of Tân Túc township, Tân Nhựt commune, the majority of Tân Kiên commune of the former Bình Chánh district and a small portion of Tân Tạo A ward of the former Bình Tân district, Ward 16 of the former District 8 will be integrated into a new commune named Tân Nhựt (Clause 116, Article 1).
