= Bình Tiên =

Bình Tiên Phường Bình Tiên
- Ward
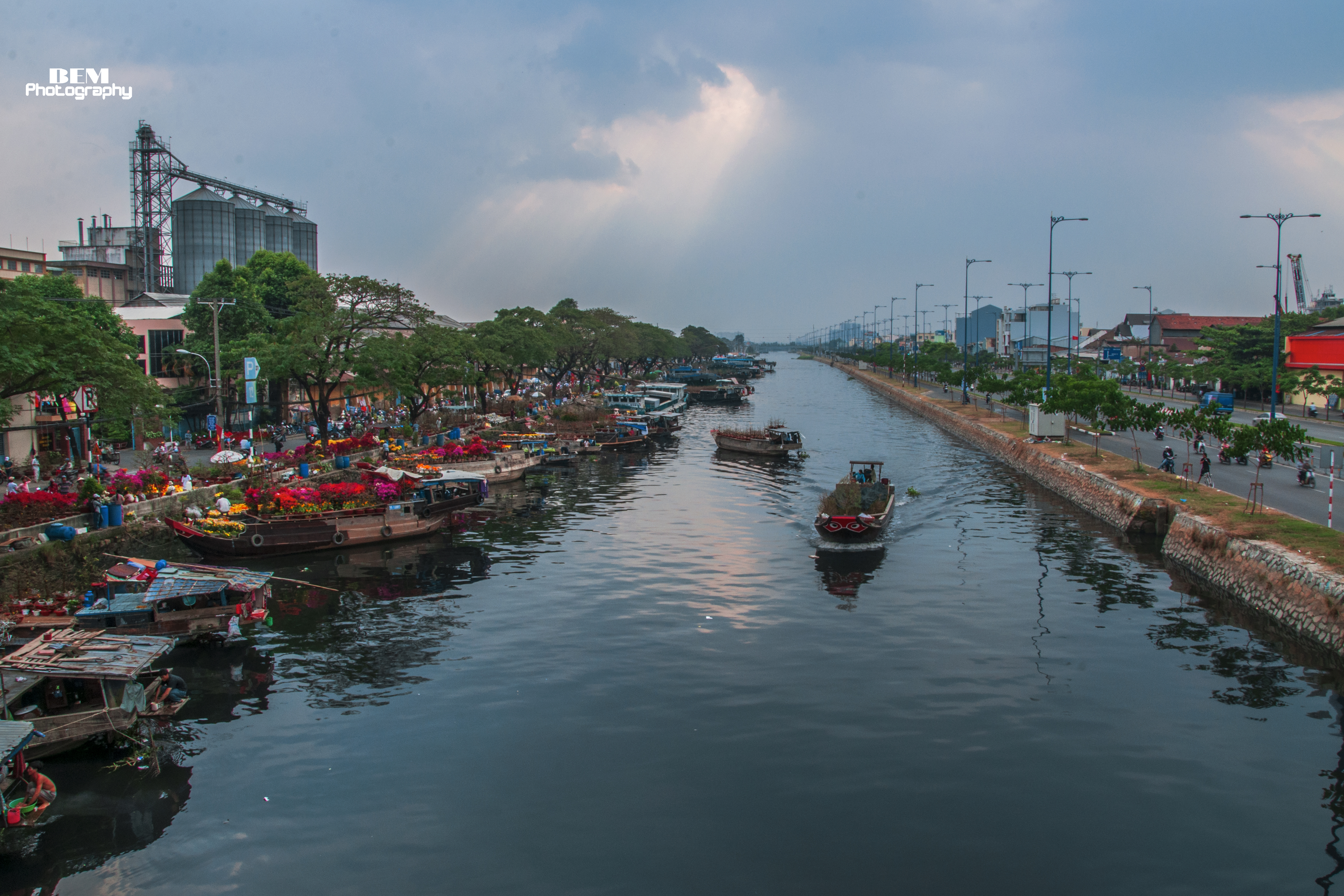
- Tàu Hủ Canal
- Interactive map of Bình Tiên
- Coordinates: 10°44′34″N 106°38′36″E
- Country: Vietnam
- Municipality: Ho Chi Minh City
- Established: June 16, 2025

Area
  - Total: 0.62 sq mi (1.61 km^{2})

Population (2024)
  - Total: 91,520
  - Density: 147,000/sq mi (56,800/km^{2})
- Time zone: UTC+07:00 (Indochina Time)
- Administrative code: 27373

Bình Tiên (Vietnamese: Phường Bình Tiên) is a ward of Ho Chi Minh City, Vietnam. It is one of the 168 new wards, communes and special zones of the city following the reorganization in 2025.

== Geography ==
Bình Tiên is located roughly 7 kilometers west of Saigon, with the following geographical location:

- To the north, it borders Bình Tây.
- To the east, it borders Chợ Lớn.
- To the south, it borders Phú Định.
- To the west, it borders Bình Phú.

According to Official Dispatch No. 2896/BNV-CQĐP dated May 27, 2025 of the Ministry of Home Affairs, following the merger, Bình Tiên has a land area of 1.61 km², the population as of December 31, 2024 is 91,520 people, the population density is 56,844 people/km².

== History ==
On June 16, 2025, the National Assembly Standing Committee issued Resolution No. 1685/NQ-UBTVQH15 on the arrangement of commune-level administrative units of Ho Chi Minh City in 2025 (effective from June 16, 2025). Accordingly, the entire land area and population of Ward 1, Ward 7 and Ward 8 of the former District 6 will be integrated into a new ward named Bình Tiên (Clause 15, Article 1).
