= Hùng Vương High School =

Public high school in Ho Chi Minh City, Vietnam

Coordinates: 10.75607°N 106.66402°E

Hung Vương High School is a 90-year-old public high school in Ho Chi Minh City, Vietnam. It was founded in 1934.

== History ==
Since the day of its foundation, the school has changed its name many times, like Cho Lon Primary School, Do Huu Phuong Primary School, and now it has been named Hùng Vương High School. Hung Vuong is known for its good teachers who possess high teaching skills and discipline. Many high-ranking official people in Vietnam graduated from the school. It became famous to a lot of parents from District 5, Ho Chi Minh City.

== Location ==
It is located in the center of District 5, a Chinatown in Ho Chi Minh City. This school is between two hospitals: Ho Chi Minh City Medicine and Pharmacy University and Pham Ngoc Thach University of Medicine. The address is 124 Hong Bang Street, Ward 12, Dist. 5.

== Ranking ==
Hùng Vương High School is in the top 100 best high schools in the country. From 2014 to 2015, it successfully admitted more than 3,000 students.

== Admission ==
Students need to have higher academic scores in their previous school exams to apply to this high school. Students need to get an aggregate of more than 85% on their previous exam.

== Uniform ==
The uniform consists of a white shirt, gray pants for boys, and a gray skirt for girls. However, on Monday, the girls need to wear traditional Vietnamese dresses.

== Education ==
Hùng Vương High School offers its courses to students from grades 10 to 12. Each grade has 25 classes and one special class for the distinction group. This group has specialized training in subjects like mathematics, physics, and chemistry.

== Infrastructure ==
This school has a well-equipped chemistry, physics, and computer lab. The school also has a large kitchen for the students to learn how to cook in. It houses a mini-football field and a basketball field.

== Sports and Events ==
Hùng Vương High School often arranges various sports events throughout the year. Students from each class have to choose their nominee for their team before the competition. Football, basketball, table tennis, and chess are the most common sports in the school. The most important of all the events held in the school is the school's "Fun Fair". On that day, teachers and students organize several stores. In each class, they have to prepare food and drinks to sell.

== Faculty ==
Coordinator

- TRƯƠNG THỊ BÍCH THUỶ

Sub Coordinator

- LÊ QUANG HUY
- DƯƠNG HOÀI BẢO
- LÝ THỊ MỸ LỆ

The school has more than a hundred teachers. The faculty consists of 41 non-teaching staff helping in the school's management.

== Notable alumni ==
Singers

- Thanh Thảo
- Yến Trang
- Ái Phương

Sports

- Lâm Đông Vượng: First position holder in Vovinam at the 2009 Asian Indoor Games

MC

- Trấn Thành

Actor

- Anh Đức
