= An Đông =

An Đông Phường An Đông (Vietnamese) 安東坊 (Chinese) An Bình, Hòa Bình
- Ward
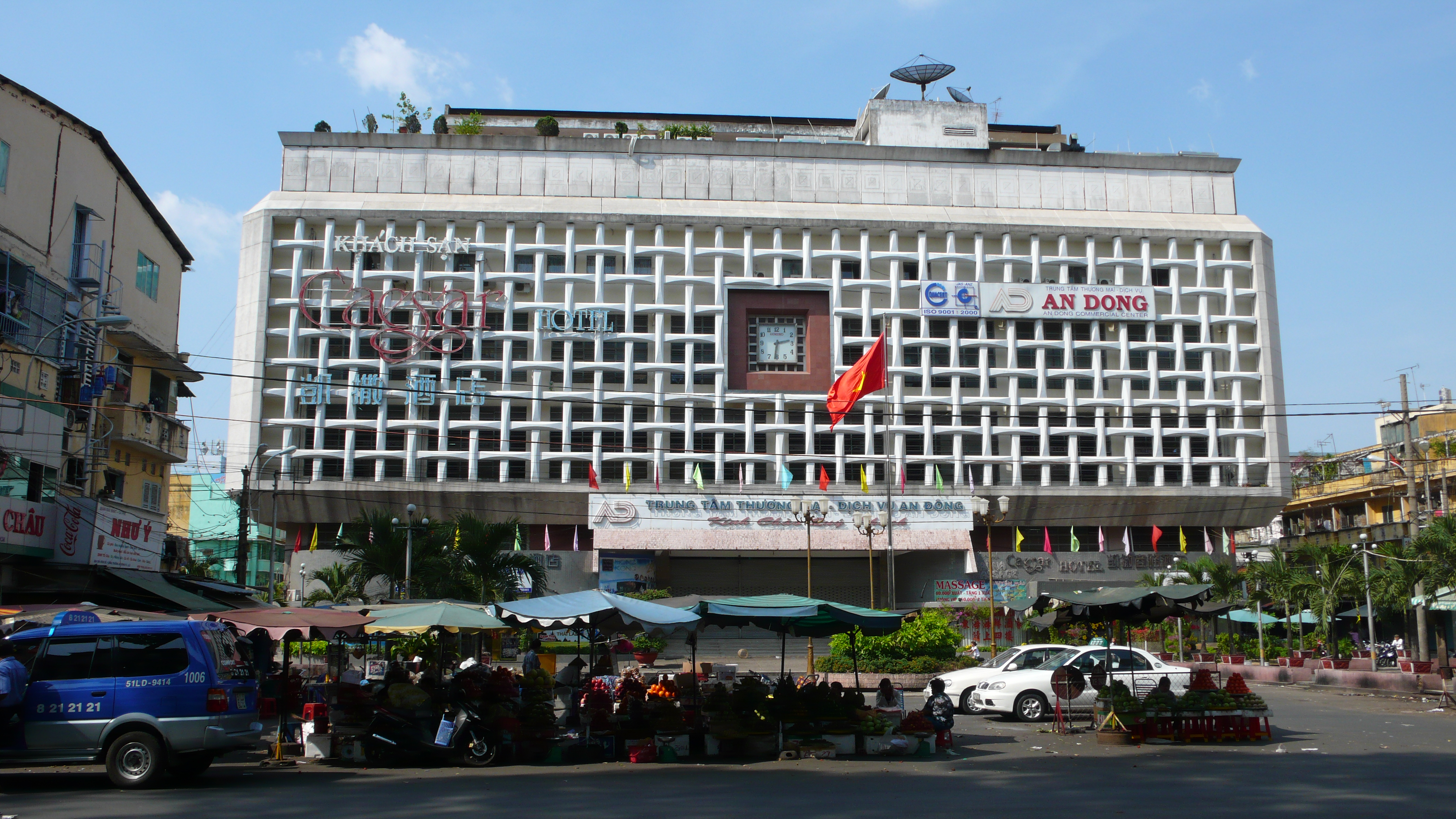
- An Đông Market

- Seal

- Location in Ho Chi Minh City
- Interactive map of An Đông
- Location in Vietnam
- Coordinates: 10°45′24″N 106°40′11″E
- Country: Vietnam
- Municipality: Ho Chi Minh City
- Established: 1 July 2025
- People's Committee Headquarters: 203 An Dương Vương St.

Government
  - Type: Ward-level authority
  - Party Secretary: Trương Minh Kiều
  - Leader of People's Committee: Nguyễn Thị Minh Phượng
  - Leader of People's Council: Trương Minh Kiều
  - Leader of Vietnam Fatherland Front Council: Nguyễn Đình Quý

Area
  - Total: 0.51 sq mi (1.32 km^{2})

Population (2024)
  - Total: 81,229
  - Density: 159,000/sq mi (61,500/km^{2})
- Time zone: UTC+07:00 (Indochina Time)
- Postal code: 72721
- Administrative code: 27316

An Đông (Vietnamese: Phường An Đông; Chinese: 安東坊 (Note: Sino-Vietnamese reading: An Đông phường Pinyin reading: Ān'dōng Fáng or Ān'dōng Fāng Jyutping reading: ngon^{1} dung^{1} fong^{1})) is a ward of Ho Chi Minh City, Vietnam. It is one of the city's 168 new wards, communes and special zones following the 2025 Vietnamese administrative reforms.

== History ==
=== Under South Vietnamese rule ===
On the 27th of March, 1959, South Vietnamese president Ngô Đình Diệm ratified Resolution No. 110-NV on dividing the existing 6 districts of Sài Gòn into 8 new districts, now consisting of: 1 (Nhứt), 2 (Nhì), 3, 4 (Tư), 5, 6, 7, and 8. Excluding districts 1-3, all other districts were accordingly renamed and their administrative boundaries altered.

The new (post-1959) District 5 was established on what was then (pre-1959) District 7 and District 4 (Tư), and initially consisted of 6 wards: An Đông, Chợ Quán, Trung Ương, Minh Mạng, Nguyễn Tri Phương, and Phú Thọ.

By 1962, Trung Ương Ward was dissolved in favor of 5 new wards: Đồng Khánh, Hồng Bàng, Khổng Tử, Nguyễn Huỳnh Đức and Trang Tử. District 5 was now divided into 10 wards, of which modern-day An Đông was located on segments of the former An Đông ward, Nguyễn Huỳnh Đức ward and Đồng Khánh ward; this would be the case until 1976.

=== 1976 - present ===
On 20 Ma, 1976, the administrative body of Sài Gòn-Gia Định (modern-day Ho Chi Minh City) underwent a second period of administrative reforms (under Resolution 301/UB), leading to the dissolution of all of District 5's 6 former wards in favor of 24 new wards, numbered '1' to '24'.

By 1 January 2025, Ward 6 had officially dissolved and merged into Ward 5 of District 5.

On 16 June 2025, the National Assembly Standing Committee issued Resolution No. 1685/NQ-UBTVQH15 on the arrangement of commune-level administrative units of Ho Chi Minh City in 2025 (Article 1 effective from 1 July 2025). Accordingly, the entire land area and population of Ward 5, Ward 7 and Ward 9 of the former District 5 was integrated into a new ward named An Đông (Clause 12, Article 1).

== Geography ==
Among the many wards surrounding the geographic center of Ho Chi Minh City, An Đông is located just 4 kilometers west of Sài Gòn ward, and borders the wards:

- Chợ Quán to the east by Trần Nhân Tôn - Huỳnh Mẫn Đạt Street
- Chợ Lớn to the west by Ngô Quyền Street
- Chánh Hưng and Phú Định to the south, along the Tàu Hủ Canal
- Diên Hồng and Vườn Lài to the north by Nguyễn Chí Thanh Street

=== Administrative divisions ===
An Đông is currently divided into 23 neighborhoods (khu phố), numbered from '1' to '23'.

== Demographics ==
According to Dispatch No. 2896/BNV-CQĐP enacted by the Ministry of Home Affairs on 27 May 2025, An Đông has a total area of 1.32 km² and a total population (as of 31 December 2024) of 81,229 – making its population density approximately 37.225 people per km². With Hoe people taking about 27% of total population.

== Government ==
Headquarters	Address
The Party Committee, the People's Council, the People's Committee & Vietnam Fatherland Front Committee of An Đông Ward	203 An Dương Vương St.
Public Administration Service Center of An Đông Ward	45 Phước Hưng St.
People's Police of An Đông Ward	78-80-82 Bùi Hữu Nghĩa St.
Military Command of An Đông Ward	47 Nguyễn Duy Dương St.

== Health ==
=== Healthcare facilities ===
Name of hospital	Address	Notes
An Bình Hospital (An Bình Hospital)	146 An Bình	Formerly Teochew Hospital (Lục ấp Triều Châu Y Viện; 六邑醫院 / 潮州醫院)
Đức Khang Hospital (Bệnh viện Đức Khang)	500 Ngô Gia Tự	Gate 1
Đức Khang Hospital (Bệnh viện Đức Khang)	129A Nguyễn Chí Thanh	Gate 2
Nguyễn Trãi Hospital (Bệnh viện Nguyễn Trãi)	314 Nguyễn Trãi	Formerly Fukien Hospital (Phúc Kiến Y Viện; 福建醫院)
Nguyễn Tri Phương Hospital (Bệnh viện Nguyễn Tri Phương)	468 Nguyễn Trãi	Formerly Guangdong Hospital (Quảng Đông Y Viện; 廣東醫院)

== Education ==
=== Higher education ===
==== Universities ====
Name of institution	Address	Website	Notes
Pre-University of Ho Chi Minh City (Trường Dự bị đại học Thành phố Hồ Chí Minh)	91 Nguyễn Chí Thanh		
Hùng Vương University, Ho Chi Minh City (Trường Đại học Hùng Vương Thành phố Hồ Chí Minh)	28–30 Ngô Quyền		Campus 1; main campus located in Chợ Lớn ward

==== Colleges ====
Name of institution	Address	Website	Notes
VOV II College (Trường Cao đẳng Phát thanh - Truyền hình II)	75 Trần Nhân Tôn		Campus 1

=== High schools (Trung học phổ thông) ===
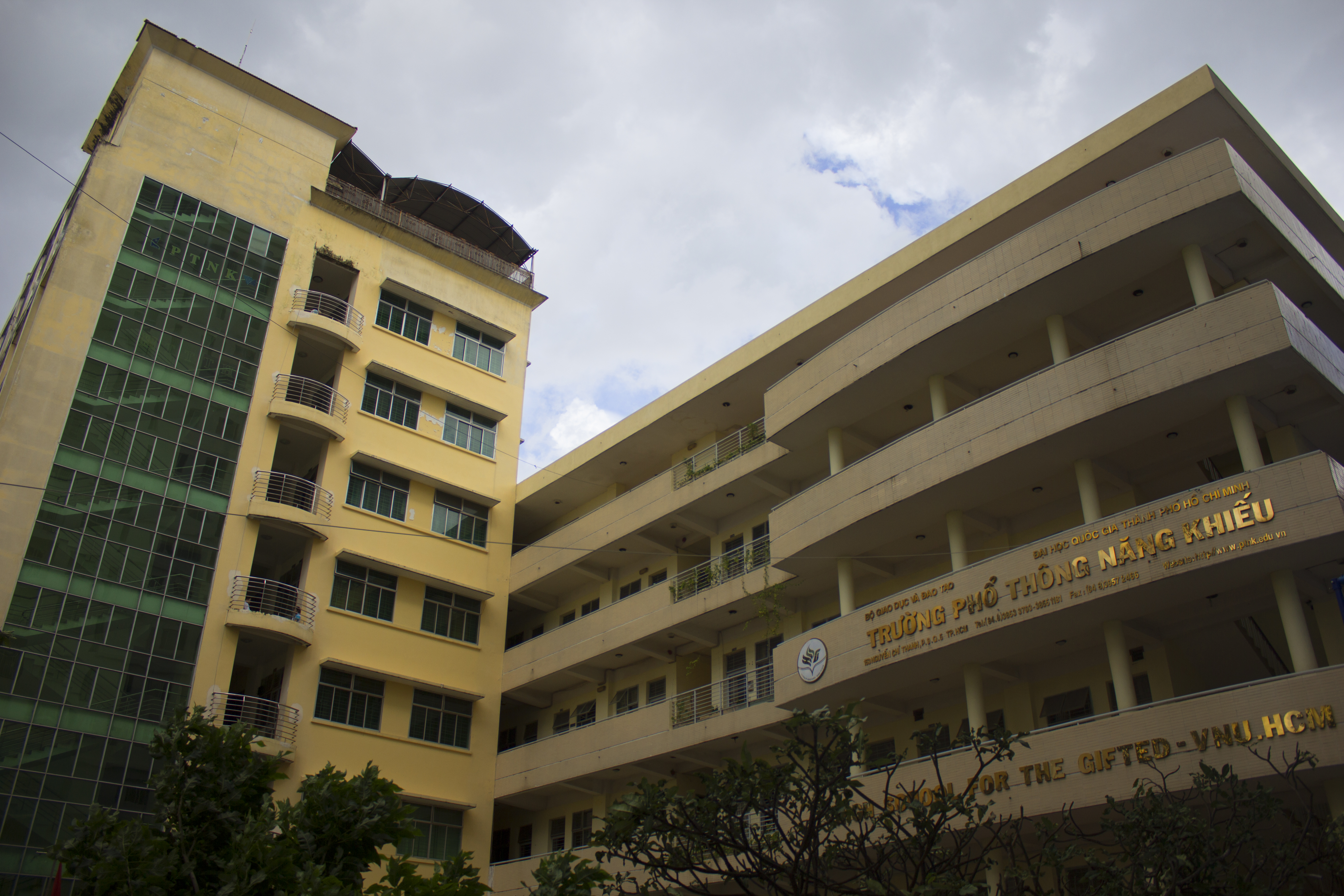
VNU-HCM High School for the Gifted

Name of institution	Address	Website	Note
VNU-HCM High School for the Gifted (Trường Phổ thông Năng khiếu, Đại học Quốc gia Thành phố Hồ Chí Minh)	153 Nguyễn Chí Thanh		
Trần Khai Nguyên High School (Trường THPT Trần Khai Nguyên)	225 Nguyễn Tri Phương		
Nguyễn Bỉnh Khiêm Secondary & High School (Trường THCS-THPT Nguyễn Bỉnh Khiêm)	28-30 Ngô Quyền		
Quang Trung - Nguyễn Huệ Secondary & High School (Trường THCS-THPT Nguyễn Bỉnh Khiêm)	223 Nguyễn Tri Phương		Nguyễn Tri Phương Campus

=== Secondary schools (Trung học cơ sở / THCS) ===
The following list does not include escalator schools offering high school education.

Name of institution	Address	Website
Kim Đồng Secondary School (Trường THCS Kim Đồng)	503 Phan Văn Trị	
Lý Phong Secondary School (Trường THCS Lý Phong)	83 Nguyễn Duy Dương	

=== Primary schools (Trường tiểu học) ===
Name of institution	Address	Website
Trần Quốc Toản Primary School (Trường Tiểu học Trần Quốc Toản)	292 Trần Phú	
Phạm Hồng Thái Primary School (Trường Tiểu học Phạm Hồng Thái)	38 Nguyễn Duy Dương	

== Gallery ==
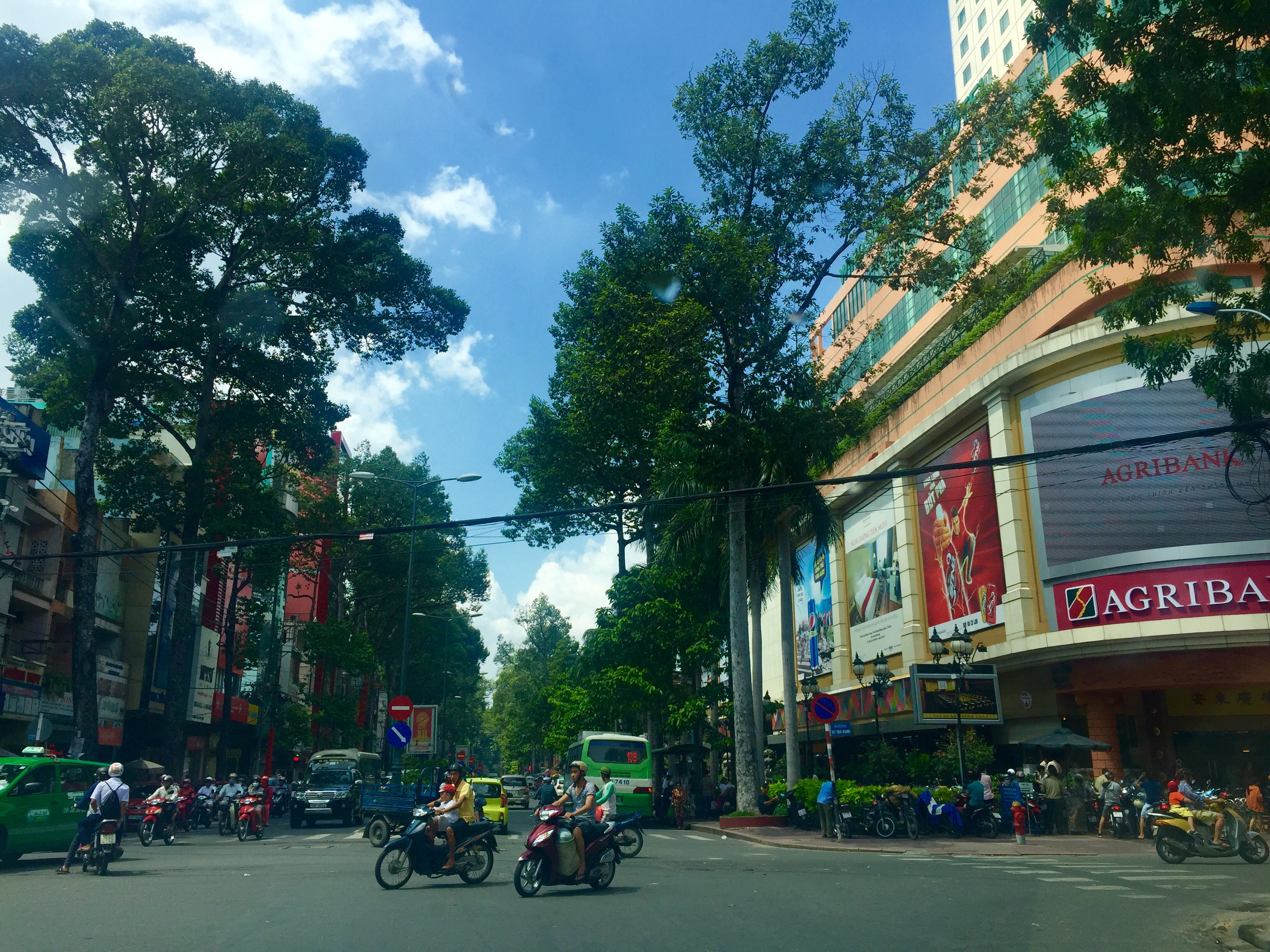
An Đông Plaza in Windsor Plaza Hotel on An Dương Vương Boulevard

Clock tower roundabout at Trần Phú and An Dương intersection

Lakai Building on Nguyễn Tri Phương Boulevard
