= Bình Đông =

Bình Đông Phường Bình Đông Hiệp Ân, Bình Điền
- Ward
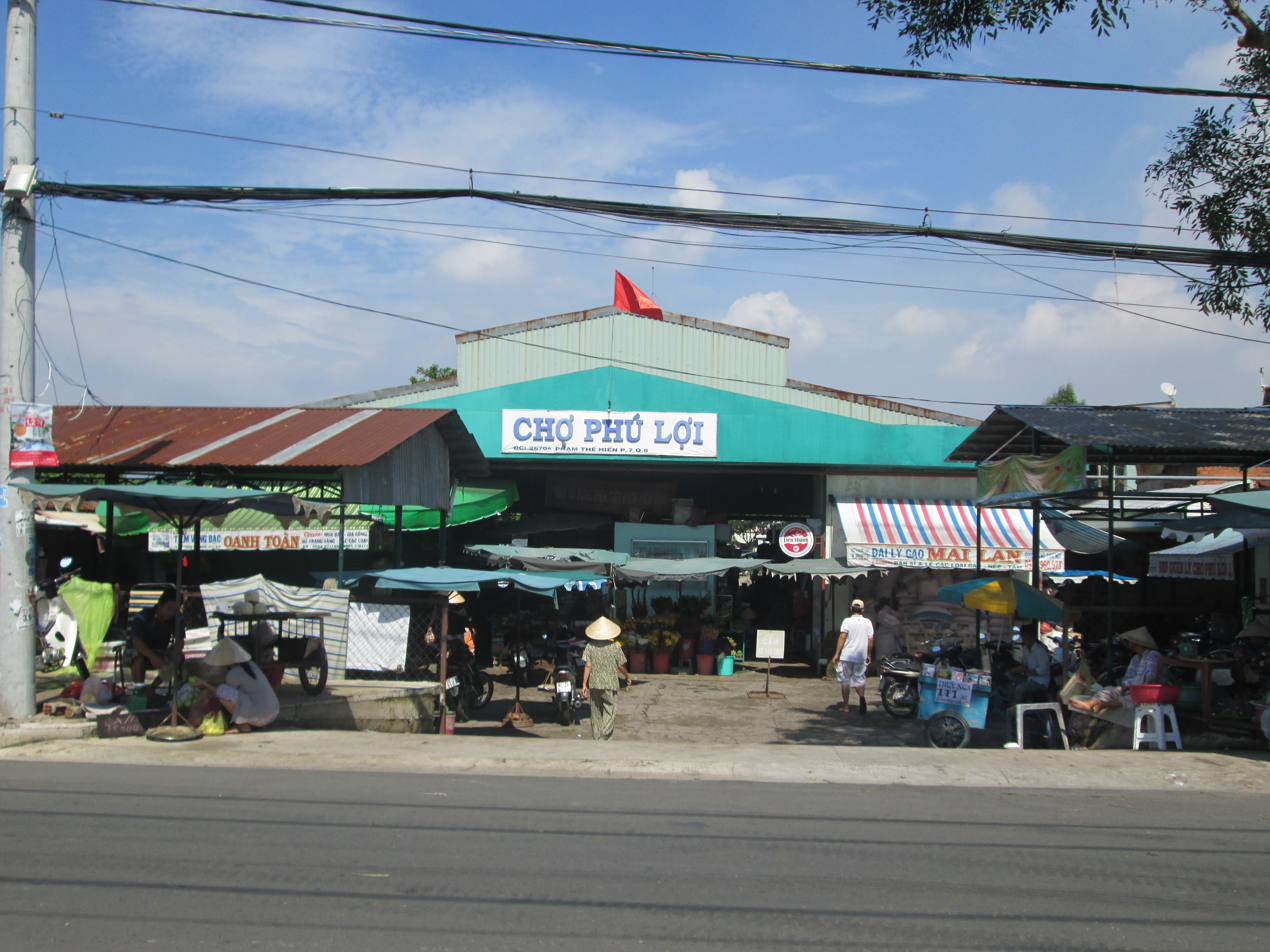
- Phú Lợi Market
- Interactive map of Bình Đông
- Coordinates: 10°43′42″N 106°38′17″E
- Country: Vietnam
- Municipality: Ho Chi Minh City
- Established: June 16, 2025

Area
  - Total: 3.45 sq mi (8.93 km^{2})

Population (2024)
  - Total: 155,555
  - Density: 45,100/sq mi (17,400/km^{2})
- Time zone: UTC+07:00 (Indochina Time)
- Administrative code: 27424

Bình Đông (Vietnamese: Phường Bình Đông) is a ward of Ho Chi Minh City, Vietnam. It is one of the 168 new wards, communes and special zones of the city following the reorganization in 2025.

== History ==
On June 16, 2025, the National Assembly Standing Committee issued Resolution No. 1685/NQ-UBTVQH15 on the arrangement of commune-level administrative units of Ho Chi Minh City in 2025 (effective from June 16, 2025). Accordingly, the entire land area and population of Ward 6, part of Ward 5, Ward 7 of the former District 8 and part of An Phú Tây commune of the former Bình Chánh district will be integrated into a new ward named Bình Đông (Clause 24, Article 1).

== Religion ==
=== Catholicism ===
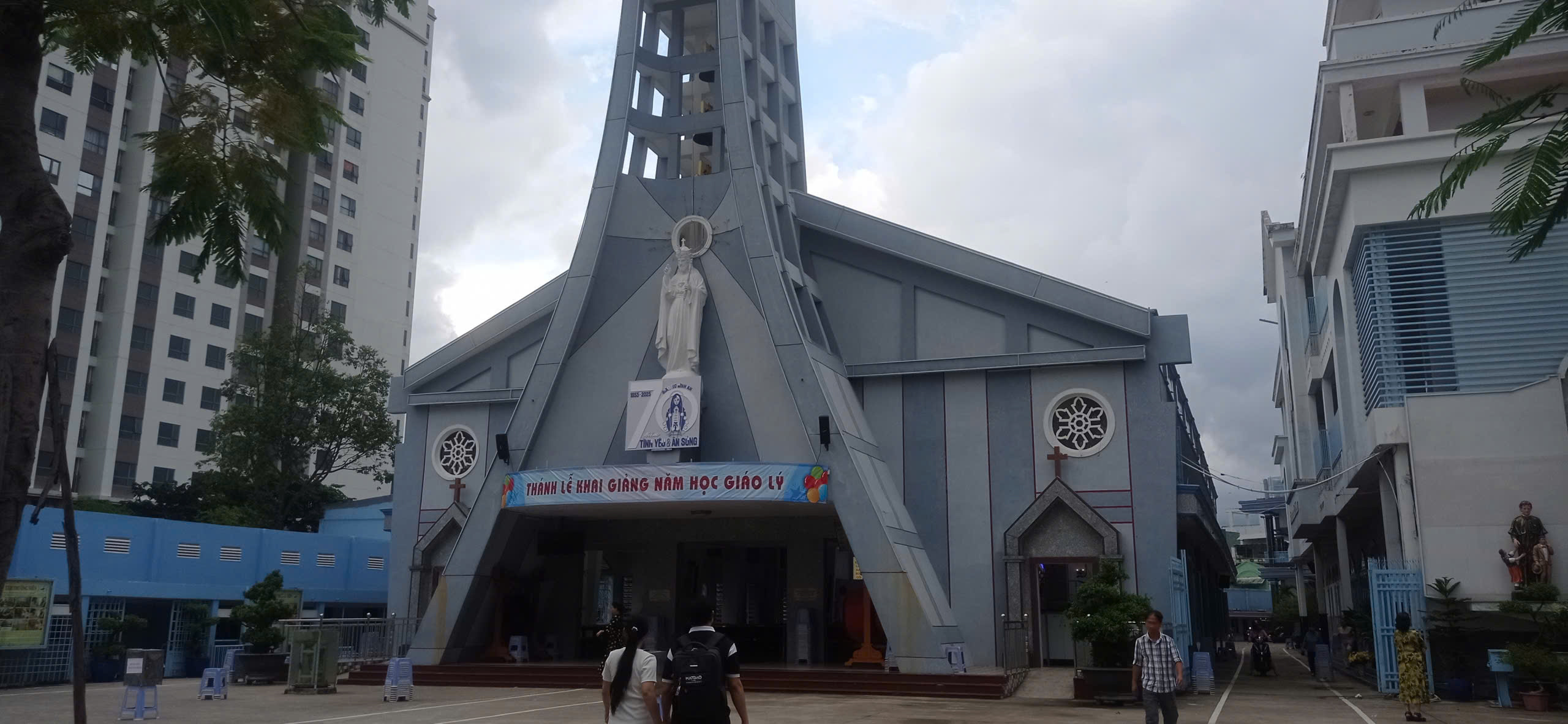
Bình An Church on Phạm Thế Hiển street

Most of the residents in the area living on Phạm Thế Hiển street are Catholic, it is nickednamed as Xóm đạo, which translates to "Catholic neighborhood". There are five large churches on the street. Every Christmas, the parishioners in this area create nativity scenes to express their gratitude and celebrate the birth of Christ. This area is known as the largest Catholic neighborhood in Ho Chi Minh City.

=== Vietnamese folk ===
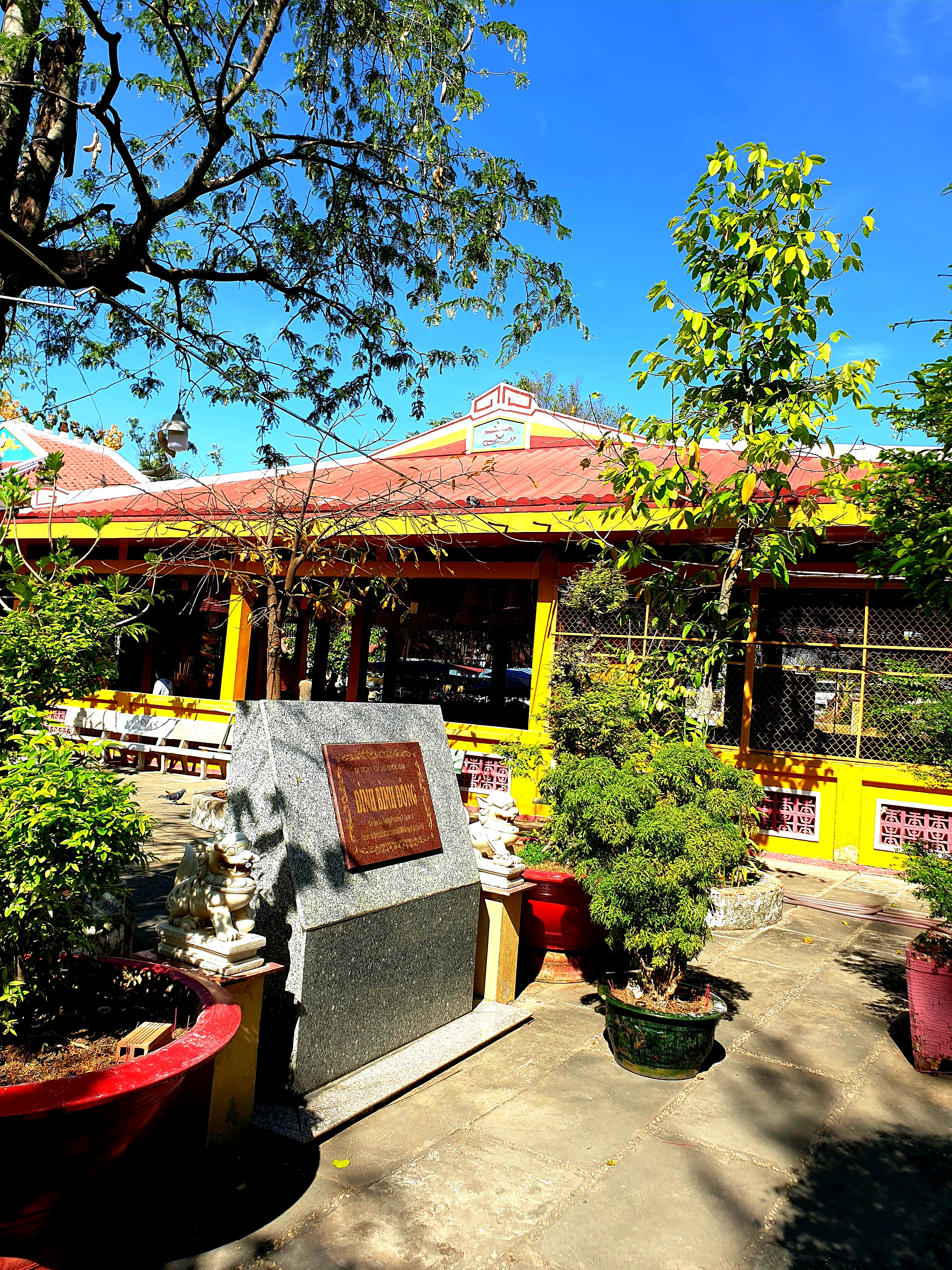
Bình Đông communal house

Bình Đông communal house is one of the old communal houses of Saigon. It has been classified as a national historical and cultural relic since 1997.

Today, Bình Đông communal house has been visited by many people, especially during Tết.
