= Chợ Quán =

Chợ Quán Phường Chợ Quán
- Ward
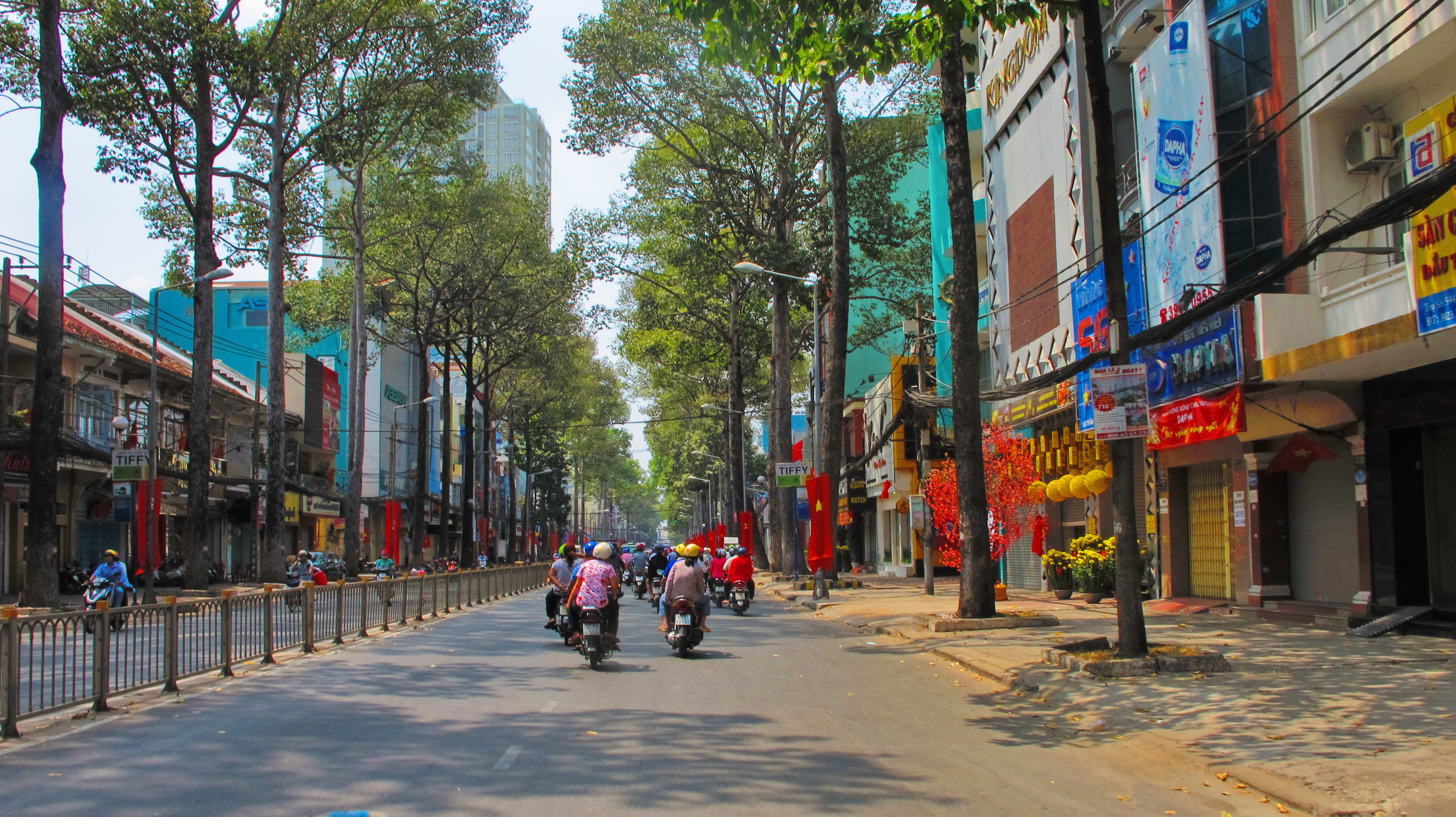
- Trần Hưng Đạo Boulevard

- Location in Ho Chi Minh City

- Location in Vietnam
- Coordinates: 10°45′13″N 106°40′53″E
- Country: Vietnam
- Municipality: Ho Chi Minh City
- Established: June 16, 2025

Area
  - Total: 0.49 sq mi (1.28 km^{2})

Population (2024)
  - Total: 63,545
  - Density: 129,000/sq mi (49,600/km^{2})
- Time zone: UTC+07:00 (Indochina Time)
- Administrative code: 27301

Chợ Quán (Vietnamese: Phường Chợ Quán) is a ward of Ho Chi Minh City, Vietnam. It is one of the 168 new wards, communes and special zones of the city following the reorganization in 2025.

== Geography ==
Chợ Quán ward adjacent to:

- Vườn Lài ward to the North by Hùng Vương Street
- Cầu Ông Lãnh ward to the East by Nguyễn Văn Cừ Boulevard
- Chánh Hưng ward to the South by Tàu Hủ Canal
- An Đông ward to the West by Huỳnh Mẫn Đạt and Trần Nhân Tôn streets

According to Official Dispatch No. 2896/BNV-CQĐP dated May 27, 2025 of the Ministry of Home Affairs, following the merger, Chợ Quán has a land area of 1.28 km², the population as of December 31, 2024 is 63,545 people, the population density is 49,644 people/km².

== History ==
Before 1975, Chợ Quán was a ward of District 5, Capital City of Sài Gòn.

On January 1, 2025, Ward 3 was dissolved and merged into Ward 2 of Quận 5.

On June 16, 2025, the National Assembly Standing Committee issued Resolution No. 1685/NQ-UBTVQH15 on the arrangement of commune-level administrative units of Ho Chi Minh City in 2025 (effective from June 16, 2025). Accordingly, the entire land area and population of Ward 1, Ward 2 and Ward 4 of the former District 5 will be integrated into a new ward named Chợ Quán (Clause 11, Article 1).

== Healthcare ==
Some major hospitals of the city are located here

- Ho Chi Minh City Hospital for Traumatology and Orthopaedics
- Ho Chi Minh City Hospital for Tropical Diseases
- Ho Chi Minh City Psychiatric Hospital
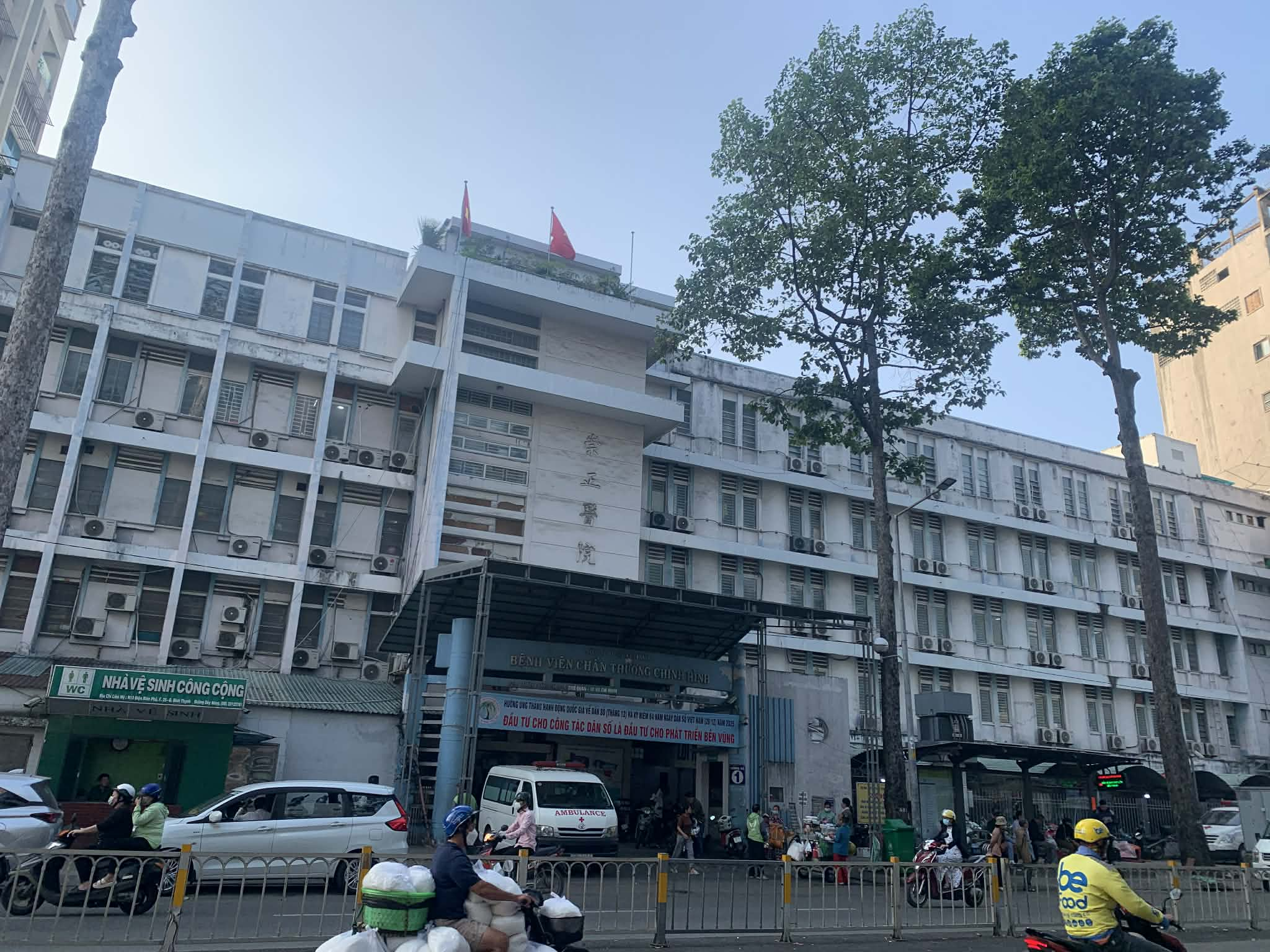
Hospital for Traumatology and Orthopaedics

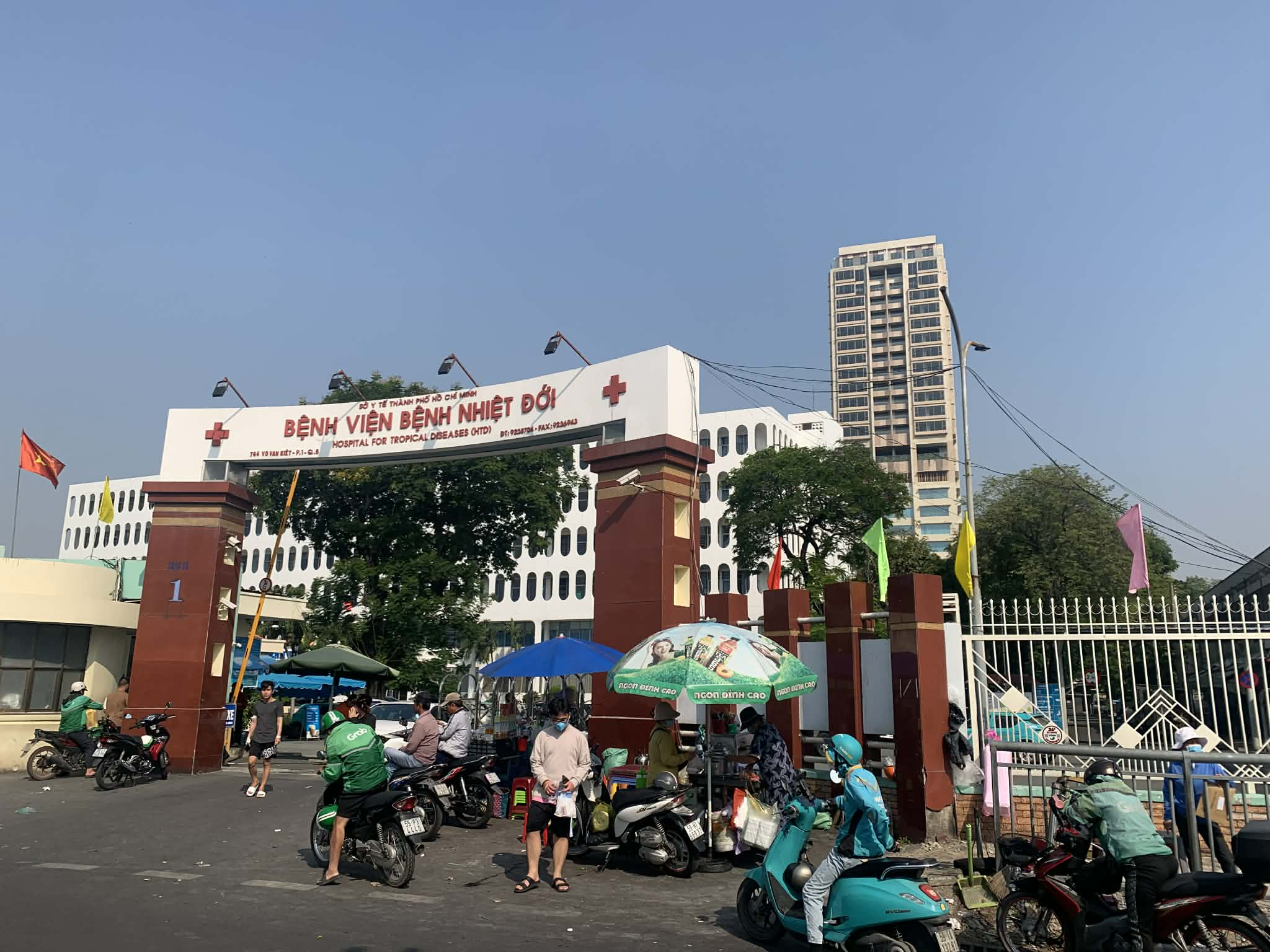
Hospital for Tropical Diseases

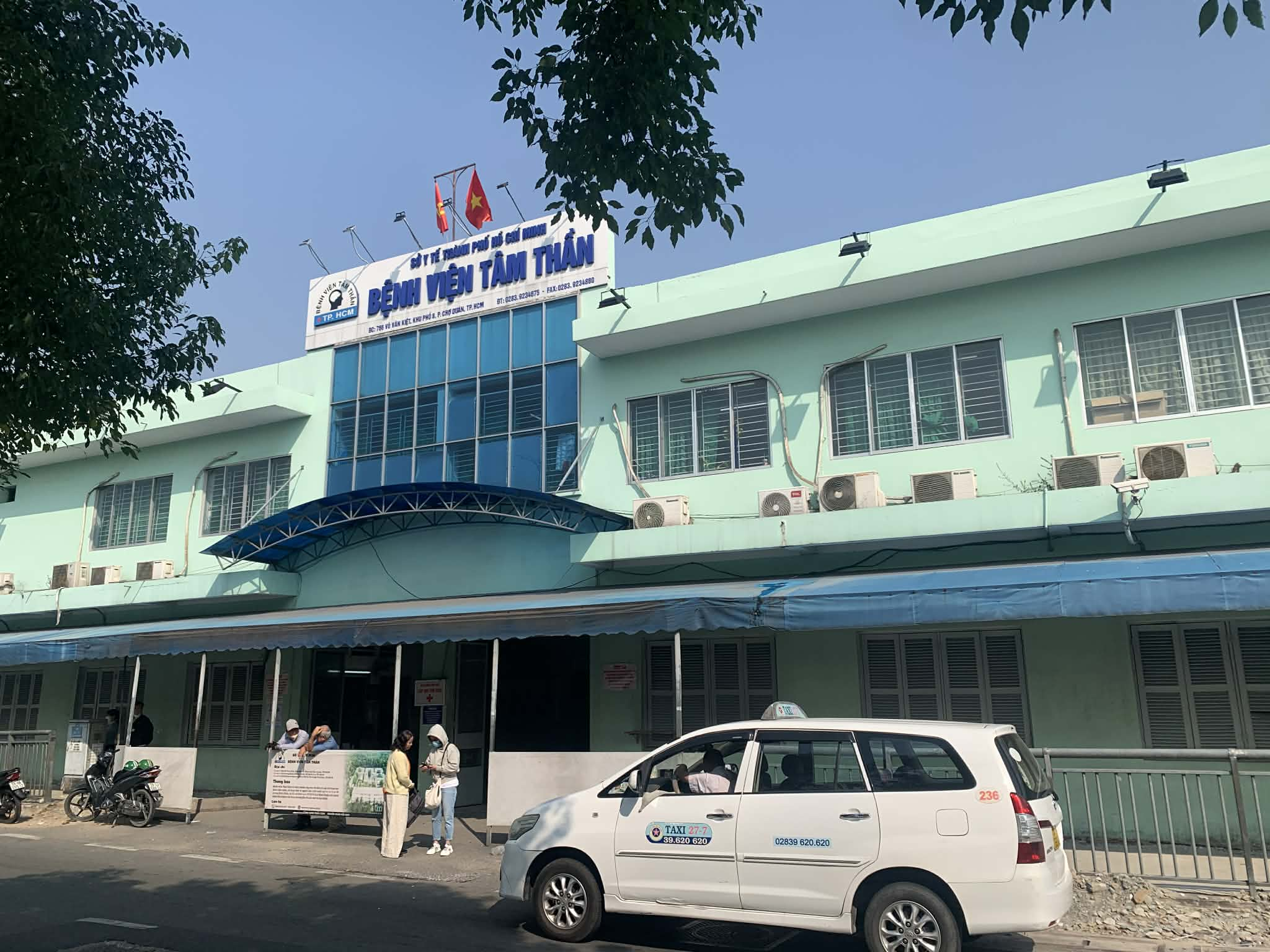
Psychiatric Hospital

== Education ==
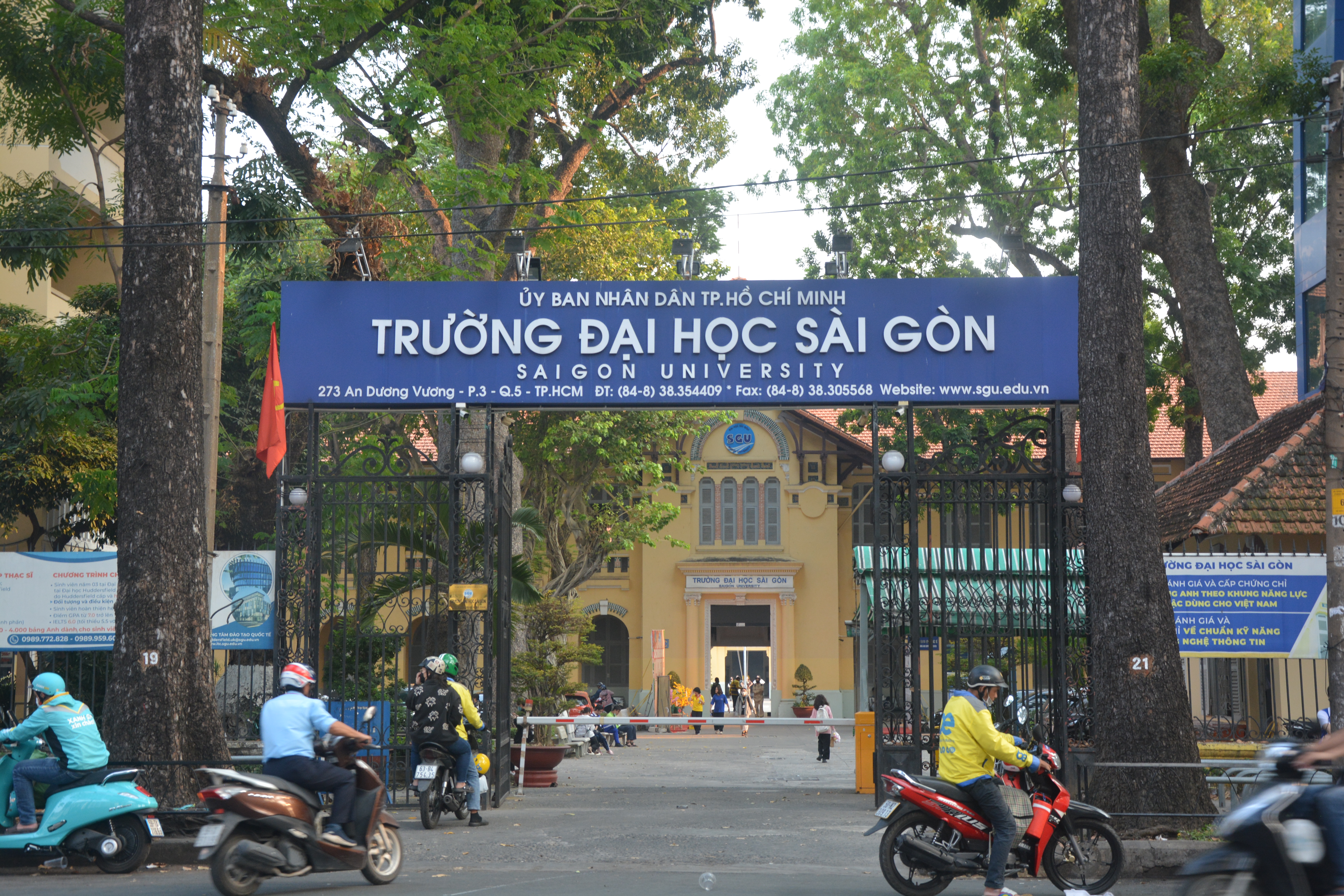
Saigon University

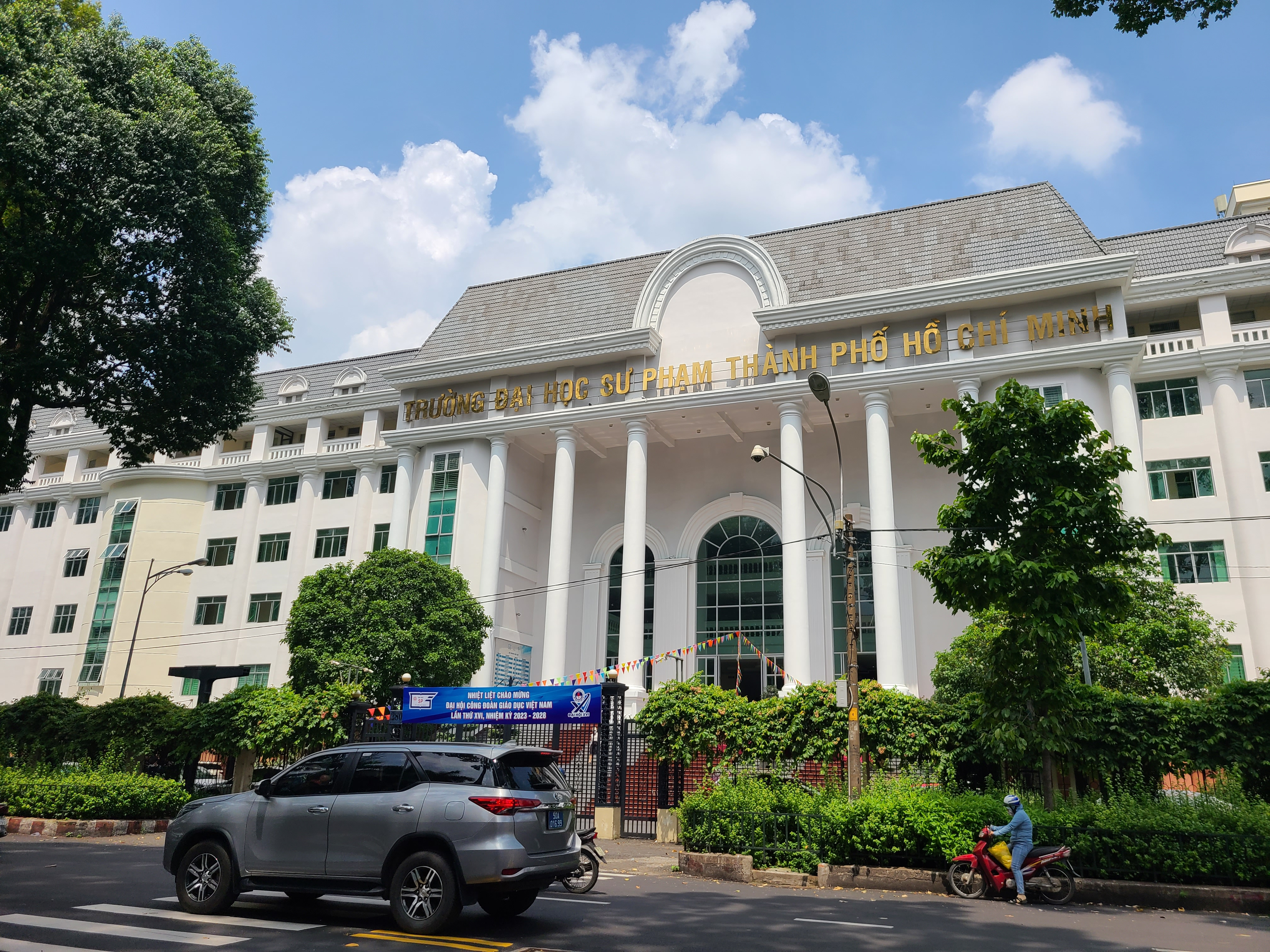
Ho Chi Minh City University of Education

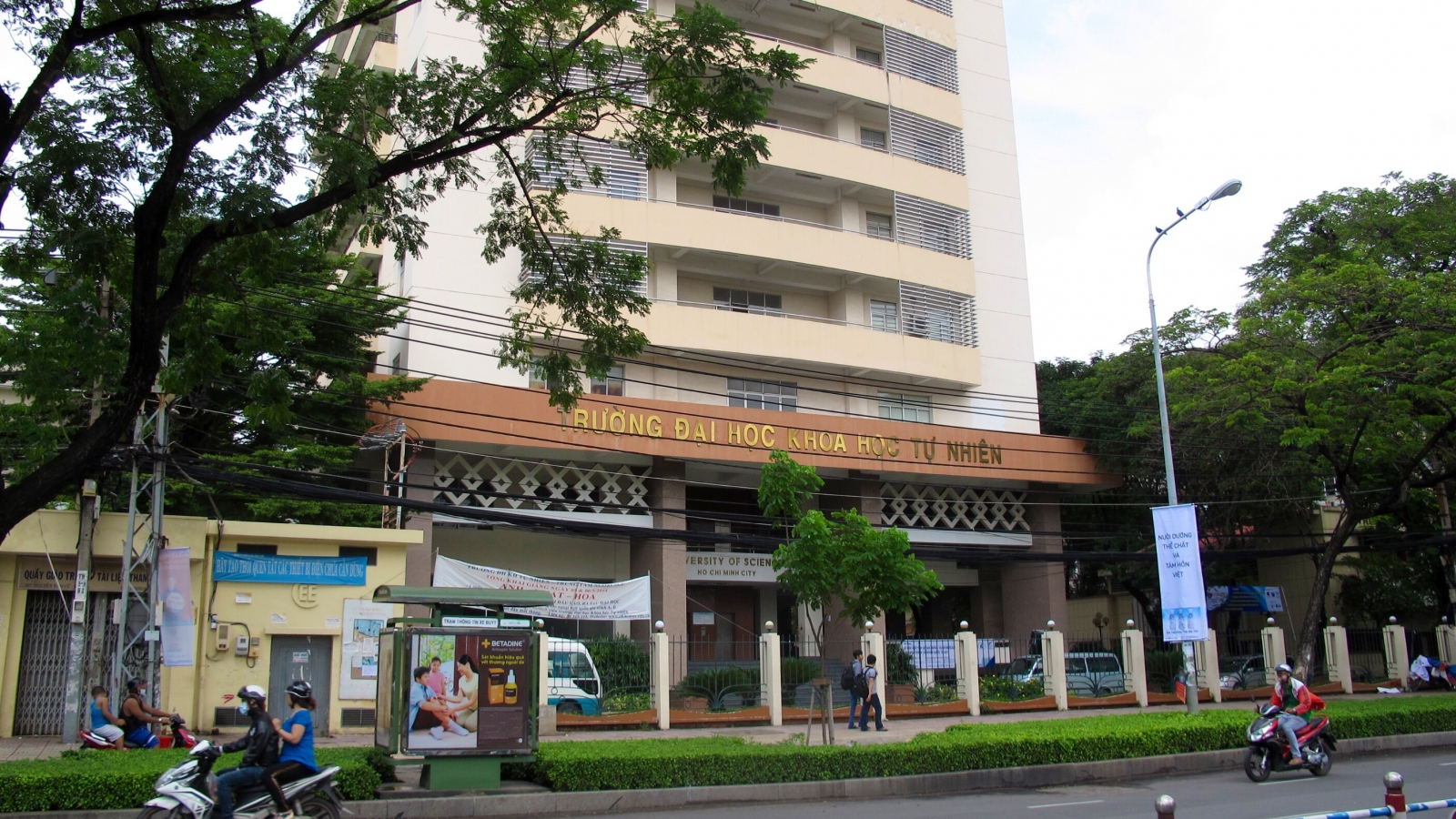
Ho Chi Minh City University of Science

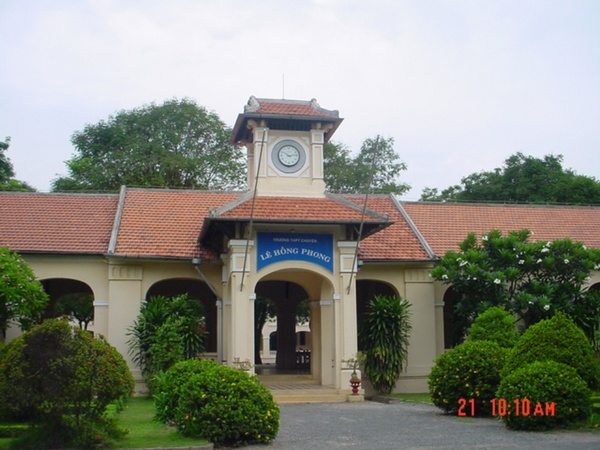
Lê Hồng Phong High School for the Gifted

=== Universities and Colleges ===
Name	Address	Website	Note
Ho Chi Minh City University of Science (HCMUS)	227 Nguyễn Văn Cừ Boulevard		Main campus, a member of VNU-HCM
Saigon University (SGU)	273 An Dương Vương Boulevard		Main campus, originally was the Collège Fraternité
Ho Chi Minh City University of Education (HCMUE)	280 An Dương Vương Boulevard		Main campus
Ho Chi Minh City College Of Foreign Economic Relation (COFER)	81 Trần Bình Trọng Street		Chợ Quán Campus

=== Secondary and high schools ===
Tên trường	Địa chỉ	Website	Note
Lê Hồng Phong High School for the Gifted	235 Nguyễn Văn Cừ Boulevard		Previously was Petrus Ký High School
Experimental High School (HCMUE)	280 An Dương Vương Boulevard		
Saigon Practice High School (SGU)	220 Trần Bình Trọng Street		
Ba Đình Secondary School	129 Phan Văn Trị Street		Previously was Thánh Linh Private School
