= Bình Lợi =

Bình Lợi Xã Bình Lợi Vườn Thơm
- Commune
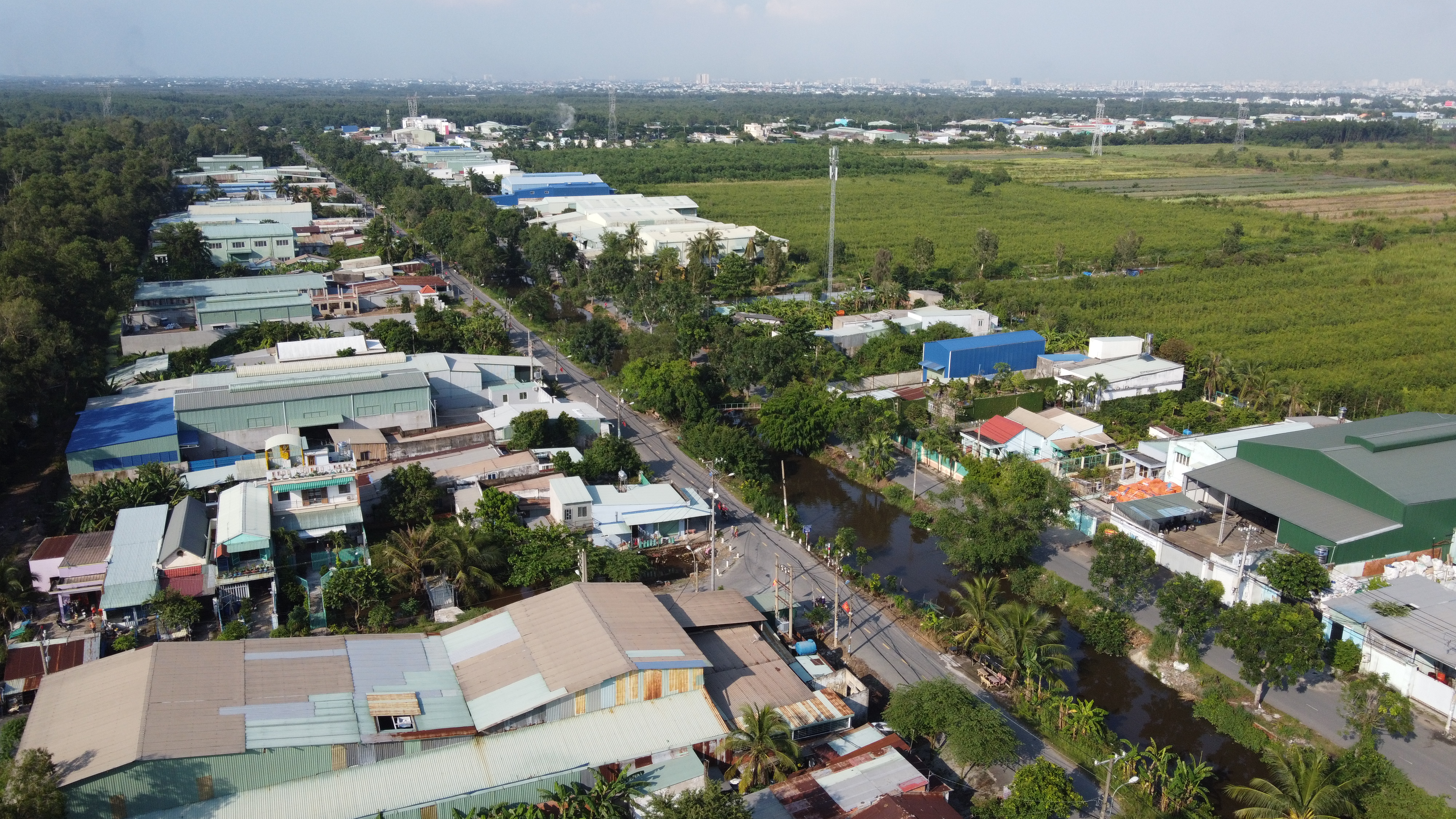
- A residential area of Bình Lợi
- Interactive map of Bình Lợi
- Coordinates: 10°45′15″N 106°31′33″E
- Country: Vietnam
- Municipality: Ho Chi Minh City
- Established: June 16, 2025

Area
  - Total: 20.92 sq mi (54.18 km^{2})

Population (2024)
  - Total: 47,180
  - Density: 2,255/sq mi (870.8/km^{2})
- Time zone: UTC+07:00 (Indochina Time)
- Administrative code: 27610

Bình Lợi (Vietnamese: Xã Bình Lợi) is a commune of Ho Chi Minh City, Vietnam. It is one of the 168 new wards, communes and special zones of the city following the reorganization in 2025.

== History ==
On June 16, 2025, the National Assembly Standing Committee issued Resolution No. 1685/NQ-UBTVQH15 on the arrangement of commune-level administrative units of Ho Chi Minh City in 2025 (effective from June 16, 2025). Accordingly, the entire land area and population of Lê Minh Xuân and Bình Lợi communes of the former Bình Chánh district will be integrated into a new commune named Bình Lợi (Clause 115, Article 1).
