= Saigon University =

University in Ho Chi Minh City, Vietnam

- Trường Đại học Sài Gòn
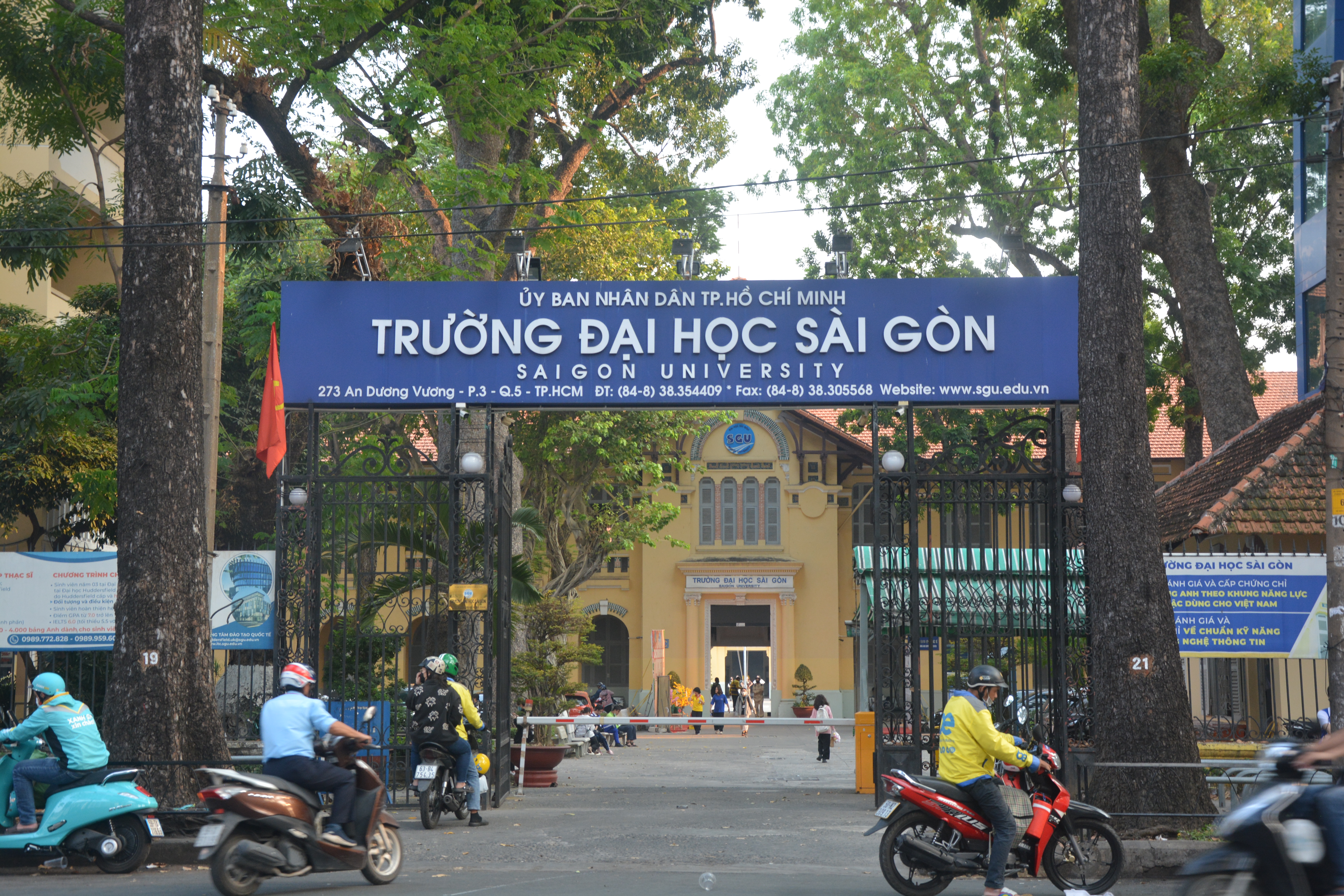
- Type: Public university
- Established: 1976; 2007
- Rector: Phạm Hoàng Quân
- Students: 19,600+ (2026)
- Location: 273 An Dương Vương Blvd., Chợ Quán Ward, District 5, Ho Chi Minh City, Vietnam; 10.760°N 106.682°E
- Campus: Urban
- Colours: Teal, Sky Blue and White
- Website: www.sgu.edu.vn

Saigon University (SGU) is a public university located in Ho Chi Minh City, Vietnam. It was founded in 1976 as a teacher training college and was upgraded and renamed as Saigon University in 2007. As of 2026, the university had over 19,600 undergraduate and graduate students enrolled full time.

The university offers 38 bachelor's degree programs, as well as 12 master's degree and 5 doctoral programs. The wide range of subjects and specialisations include law, business administration, information technology, applied mathematics, environmental science, biotechnology, electrical engineering, psychology, international studies, English language studies, Vietnam studies, library science and pedagogical subjects.

== History ==
The campus headquarters first opened in 1908 as the Lycée Franco-Chinois (French-Chinese High School). It was founded by merchant Xie Matian for the children of Chinese immigrants in Vietnam. As the oldest campus in Ho Chi Minh City, the buildings in Chợ Quán (formerly District 5) have been designated as a historical architectural monument.

In 1976, following the end of the Vietnam War and the reunification of north and south, it became the headquarters for the Teacher Training College (Saigon Pedagogical College and then Ho Chi Minh City Pedagogical College).

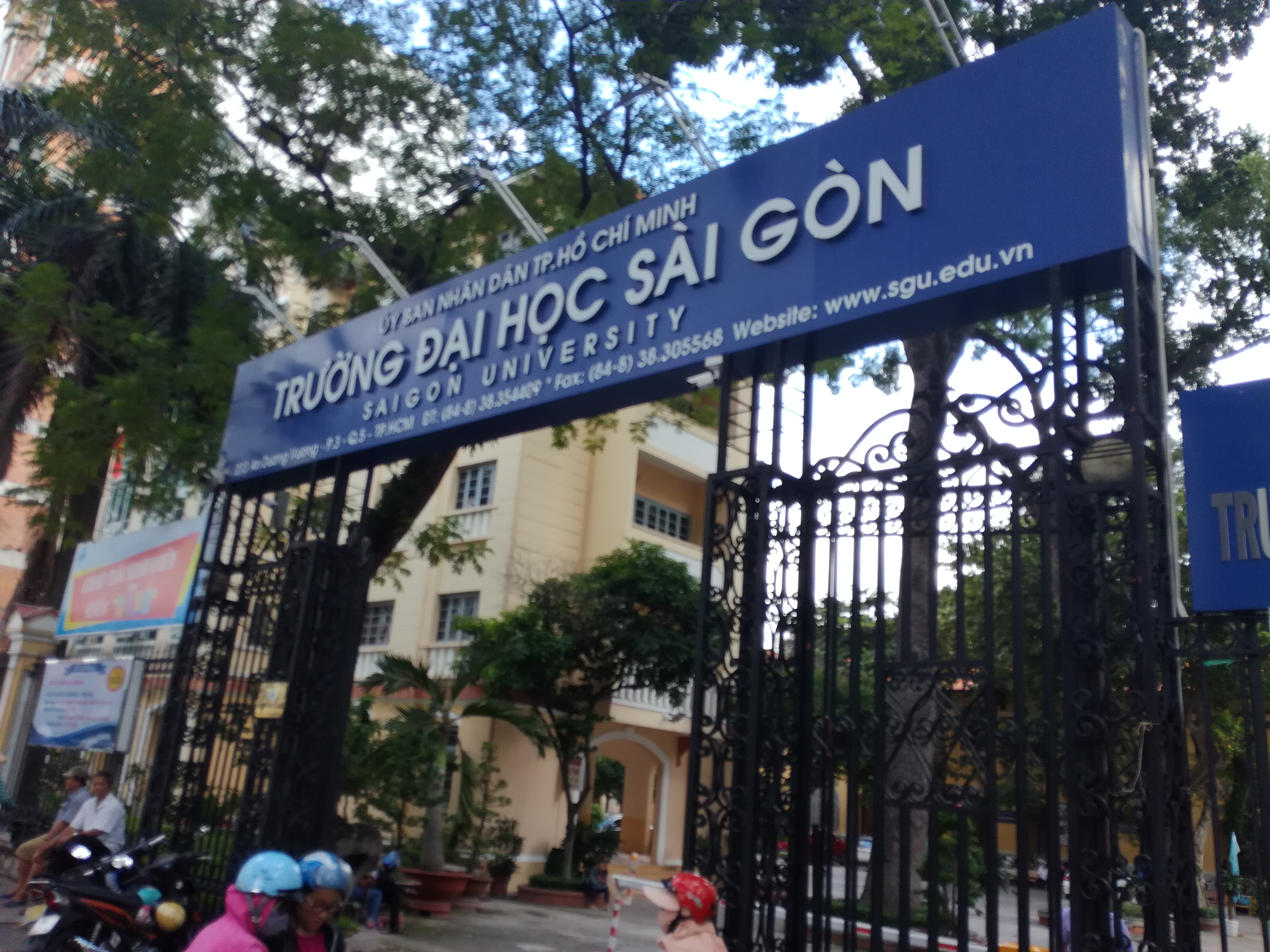

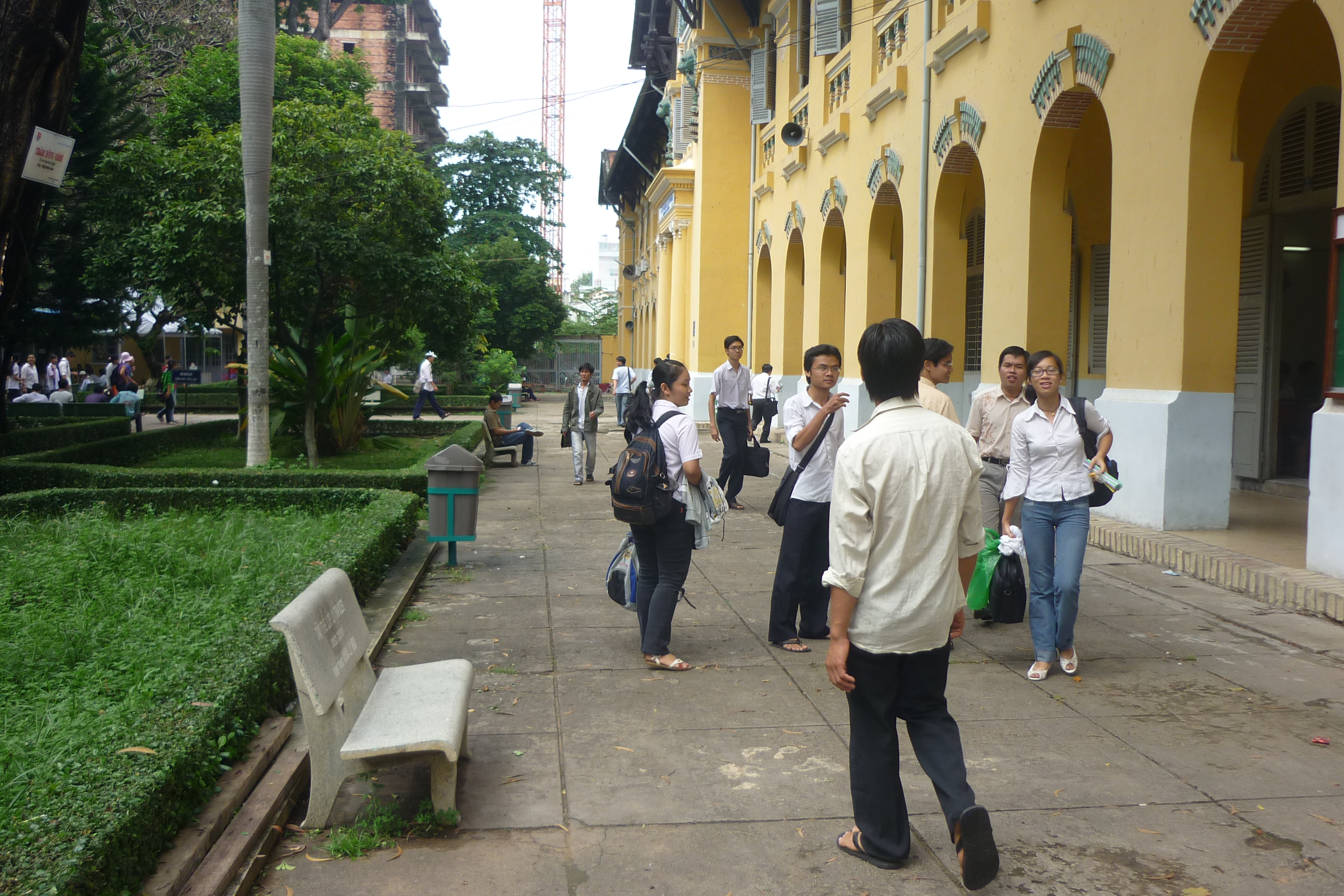

The present-day Saigon University was established on 25 April 2007. The decision was pursuant to Government Decision No. 478/QĐ-TTTg by Prime Minister Nguyễn Tấn Dũng. It operates under the People's Committee in Ho Chi Minh City and is overseen by the Ministry of Education and Training.

== Campus ==
The headquarters of Saigon University is in Ho Chi Minh City, with an official address of 273 An Dương Vương Boulevard in Chợ Quán (formerly District 5).

Other campuses are located at:

- No. 1: 105 Bà Huyện Thanh Quan, Xuân Hòa (District 3)
- No. 2: Tôn Đức Thắng Boulevard, Saigon (District 1)
- No. 3: Ngô Thời Nhiệm Street, Xuân Hòa (District 3)
- Saigon Practice High School – 220 Trần Bình Trọng, Chợ Quán, District 5

A new campus is currently under development in the new urban area in Southern Ho Chi Minh City.

== Partner universities ==
- (Austria) IMC University of Applied Sciences Krems
