= Huỳnh Ngọc Sỹ =

Huỳnh Ngọc Sĩ (or Huỳnh Ngọc Sỹ; born 1953) was a vice director of Department of Transport of Ho Chi Minh City. He was also the director of the East/West Highway Project Management Unit, a section of the Ho Chi Minh City government in charge of constructing the trunk road.

In 2007, four officials of the Japanese Pacific Consultants International (PCI) declared that from 2002 to 2006, during the implementation of the East-West avenue project in Ho Chi Minh, they gave more than $800,000 to Si to win a consulting contract. On November 19, 2008 Si was suspended for investigation.
