= An Lạc, Ho Chi Minh City =

An Lạc Phường An Lạc
- Ward
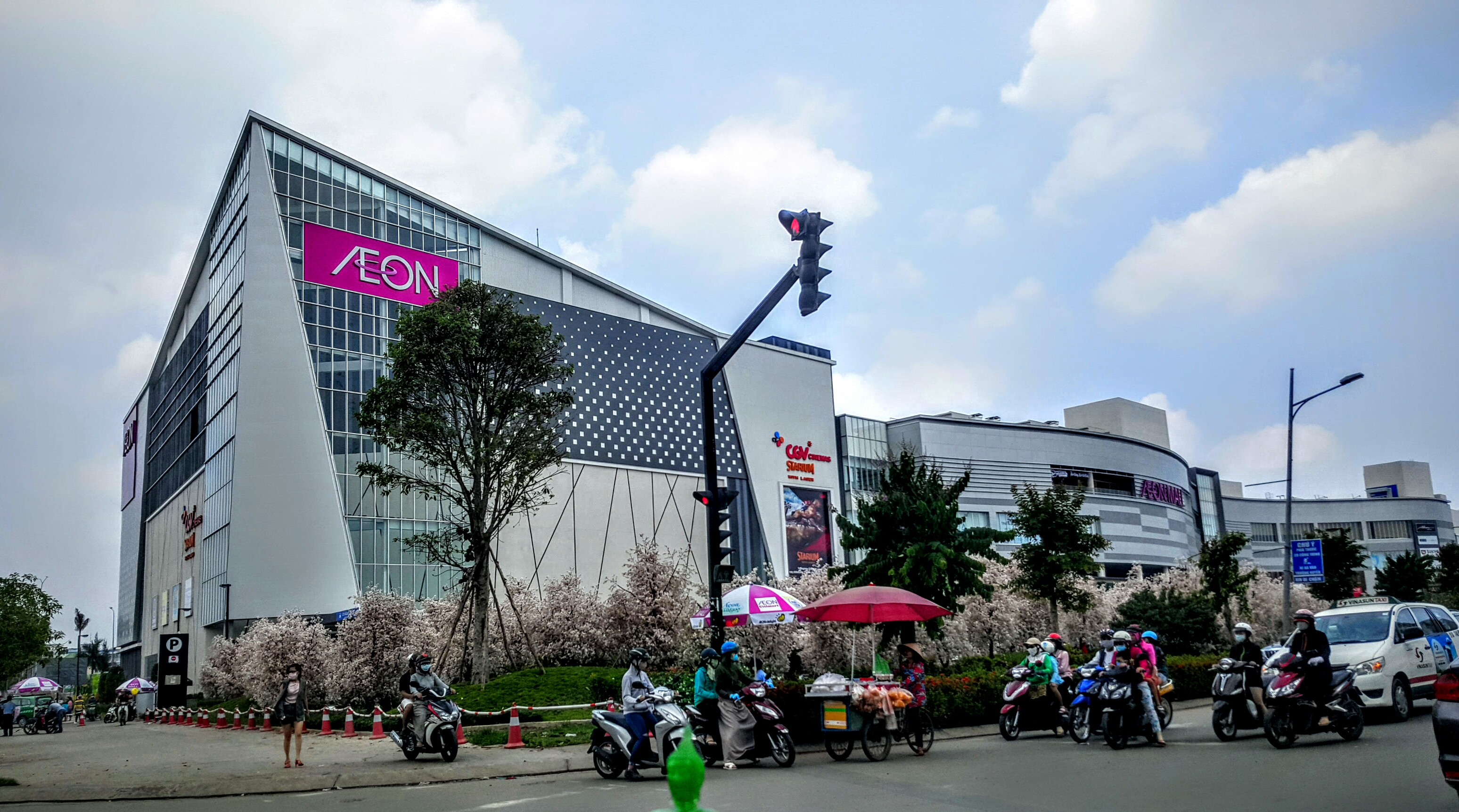
- Aeon Mall Bình Tân at An Lạc
- Interactive map of An Lạc
- Coordinates: 10°43′49″N 106°36′37″E
- Country: Vietnam
- Municipality: Ho Chi Minh City
- Established: June 16, 2025

Area
  - Total: 4.04 sq mi (10.47 km^{2})

Population (2024)
  - Total: 172,134
  - Density: 42,580/sq mi (16,440/km^{2})
- Time zone: UTC+07:00 (Indochina Time)
- Administrative code: 27460

An Lạc (Vietnamese: Phường An Lạc) is a ward of Ho Chi Minh City, Vietnam. It is one of the 168 new wards, communes and special zones of the city following the reorganization in 2025.

== History ==
On June 16, 2025, the National Assembly Standing Committee issued Resolution No. 1685/NQ-UBTVQH15 on the arrangement of commune-level administrative units of Ho Chi Minh City in 2025 (effective from June 16, 2025). Accordingly, the entire land area and population of An Lạc, An Lạc A and Bình Trị Đông B wards of the former Bình Tân district will be integrated into a new ward named An Lạc (Clause 37, Article 1).
