= Pham Ngoc Thach University of Medicine =

Public medical school in Ho Chi Minh City, Vietnam

Coordinates: 10.7737°N 106.6654°E

- Đại học Y Khoa Phạm Ngọc Thạch
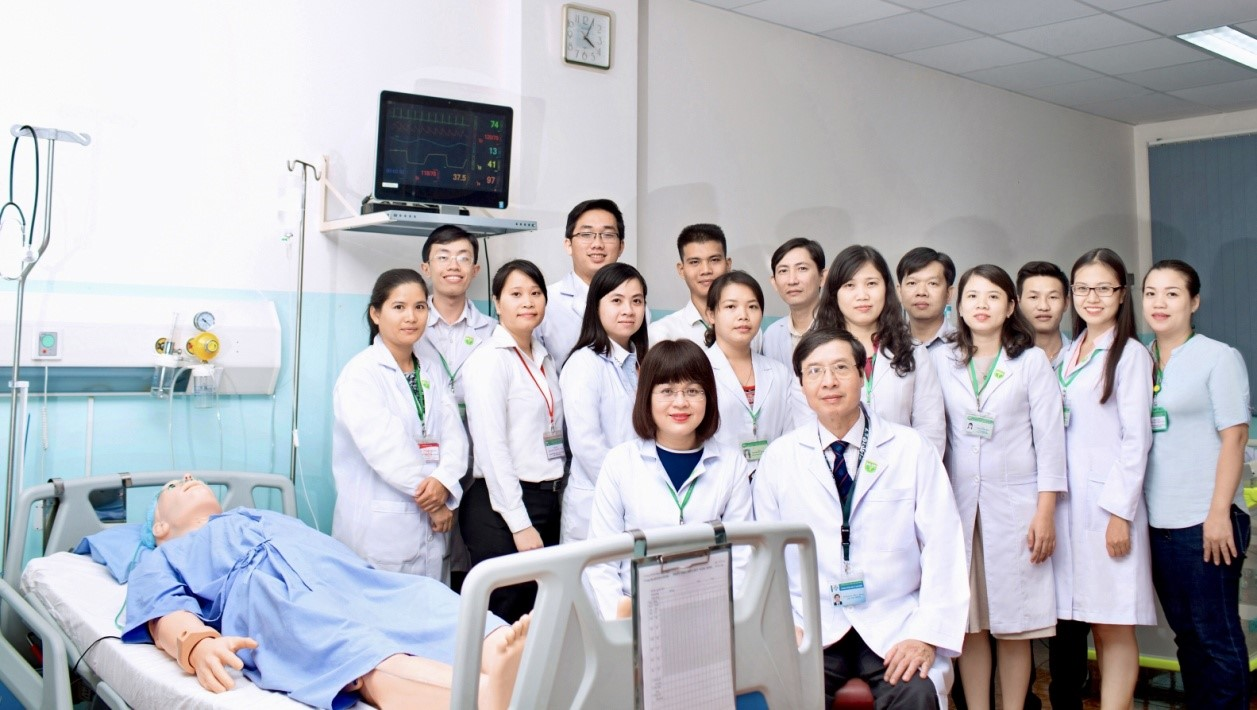
- PNTU's Center for Elaboration Competency and Innovation in Clinical Simulation (CECICS)
- Former names: Centre for training and education of healthcare staff, HCMC
- Type: Public
- Established: 1989
- Principal: Assoc. Prof. Dr. Ngô Minh Xuân
- Location: Ho Chi Minh City, Vietnam
- Website: pnt.edu.vn
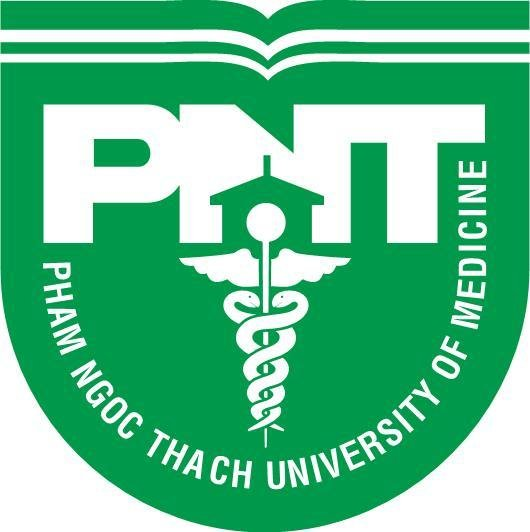

Pham Ngoc Thach University of Medicine is a public medical school in Ho Chi Minh City, Vietnam. It offers graduate and postgraduate education in medicine, health care staff training for the city.

It was officially recognized as a University on 7/1/2008. The approval decision was written by Prime Minister Nguyen Tan Dung.

Originated from a center for training and educating of healthcare staff in Ho Chi Minh City, Pham Ngoc Thanh University of Medicine was directed by the city council to operate as a university for the city. Unlike Ho Chi Minh City Medicine and Pharmacy University, it only allowed Ho Chi Minh citizens who had city hukous (household registers) to attend. However, in 2016, this requirement was removed and people from other provinces can attend.

== School managing board ==
- Principal: Associate Professor Dr. Nguyễn Thanh Hiệp
- Vice Principal: Dr. Phan Nguyễn Thanh Vân
