= Bình Chánh district =

Bình Chánh district Huyện Bình Chánh
- District
- Position in the metropolitan area of HCMC

- Location within Vietnam
- Coordinates: 10°45′01″N 106°30′45″E
- Country: Vietnam
- Municipality: Ho Chi Minh City
- Capital: Tân Túc

Area
  - Total: 253 km^{2} (98 sq mi)

Population (2019)
  - Total: 705,508
  - Density: 2,790/km^{2} (7,220/sq mi)

Demographics
  - Main ethnic groups: predominantly Kinh
- Time zone: UTC+07 (ICT)
- Website: binhchanh.hochiminhcity.gov.vn

Bình Chánh is a former rural district (huyện) in the southwest of Ho Chi Minh City in Vietnam. High urbanization rate has made Bình Chánh become one of a high population growth districts in the city. As of 2019, the district had a population of 705,508. It covers an area of 253 km^{2}. The district capital lies at Tân Túc.

Bình Chánh district borders District 7, District 8, Bình Tân district, Hóc Môn District and Nhà Bè District.

== Education ==
=== Universities ===
- University of Economics Ho Chi Minh City
- Ho Chi Minh City University of Economics and Finance
- Văn Hiến University
- Pham Ngoc Thach University of Medicine
