= Phú Định =

Phú Định Phường Phú Định Bình Đông, Xóm Củi, Rạch Cát
- Ward
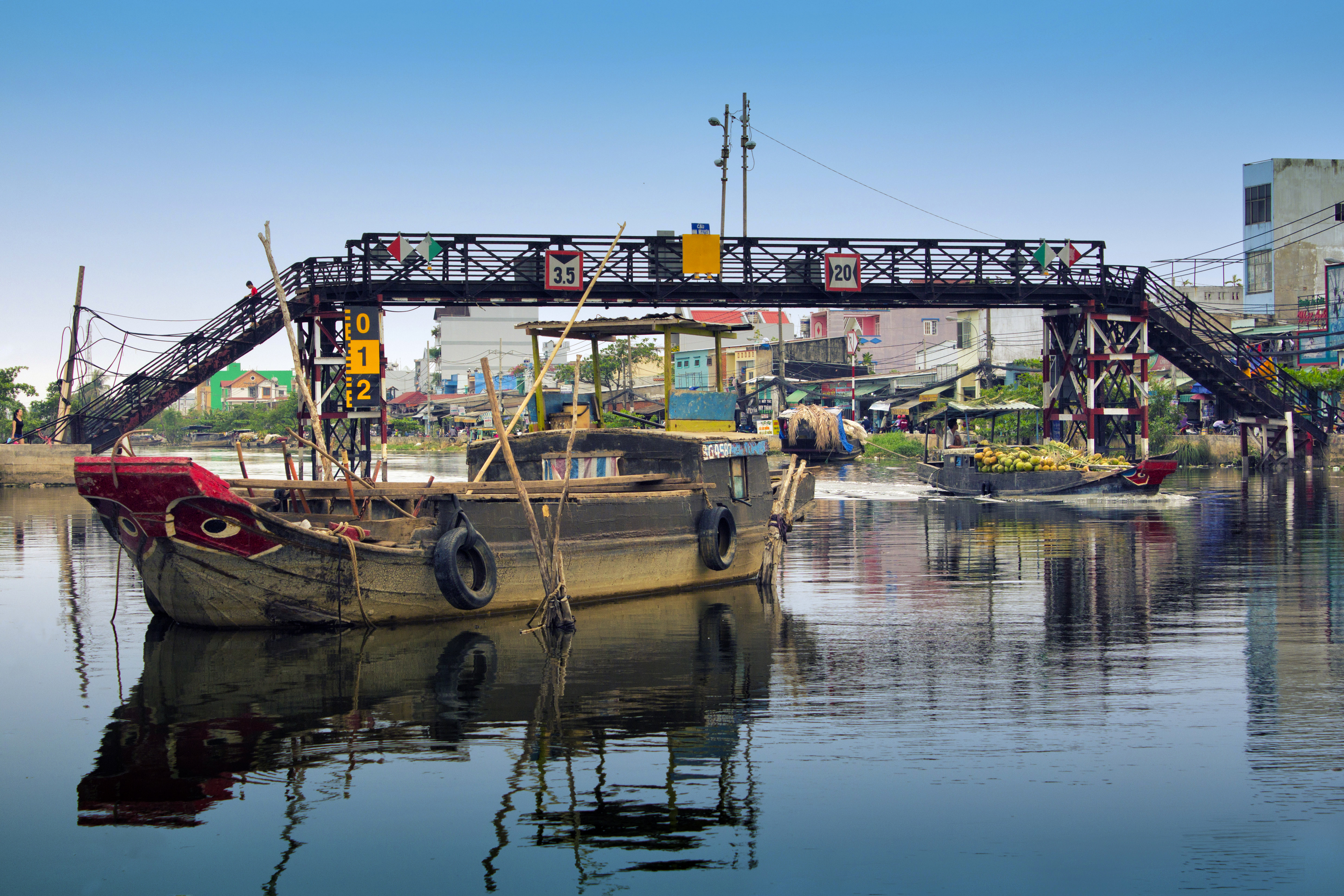
- Mễ Cốc Wharf
- Interactive map of Phú Định
- Coordinates: 10°43′25″N 106°37′46″E
- Country: Vietnam
- Municipality: Ho Chi Minh City
- Established: June 16, 2025

Area
  - Total: 2.26 sq mi (5.85 km^{2})

Population (2024)
  - Total: 150,389
  - Density: 66,600/sq mi (25,700/km^{2})
- Time zone: UTC+07:00 (Indochina Time)
- Administrative code: 27427

Phú Định (Vietnamese: Phường Phú Định) is a ward of Ho Chi Minh City, Vietnam. It is one of the 168 new wards, communes and special zones of the city following the reorganization in 2025.

== History ==
On June 16, 2025, the National Assembly Standing Committee issued Resolution No. 1685/NQ-UBTVQH15 on the arrangement of commune-level administrative units of Ho Chi Minh City in 2025 (effective from June 16, 2025). Accordingly, the entire land area and population of Ward 14, Ward 15, Xóm Củi ward and most of Ward 16 of the former District 8 will be integrated into a new ward named Phú Định (Clause 23, Article 1).
