= Tàu Hủ Canal =

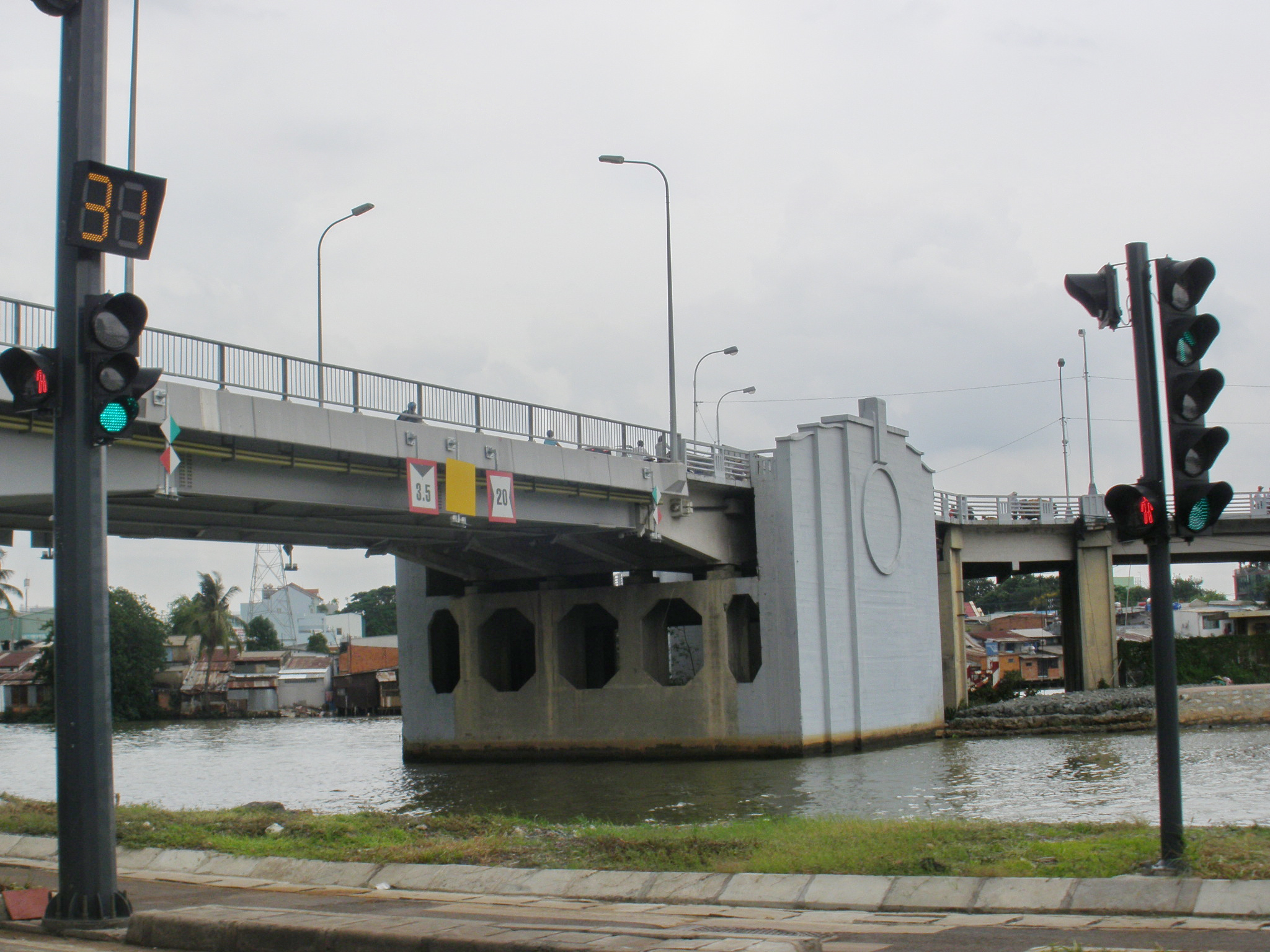
Tàu Hủ Canal

The Tàu Hủ Canal area is also known as Bến Bình Đông (lit. Bình Đông Wharf). It is an artery for trade and transportation of fruits from southwest Vietnam to Saigon.

In Chợ Lớn market in 1819, the Bến Nghé Channel becomes narrow and shallow dredged from cutesy to the intersection of Sand River canal (Rạch Cát). This business segment length 5.472 meters was named An Thông Hà. Starting from the date of 23-1, nearly 12,000 people have completed the canal on the day on 23r April, 1819 under the direction of Deputy Town Gia Định Huỳnh Công Lý (father-in-law Minh Mạng). Then, in 1887 and 1889, Kinh Tau Hu dredged 2 again under French colonialism.

Along with economic Bowel-Lò Gốm canal and the River Horse serial Cần Giuộc south, Kinh Tàu Hủ occupies an important position in terms of strategy and economics, connecting waterways of the Mekong Delta to Cholon, Saigon. Train boatload of Contents provincial agricultural forth busiest on business, on both sides of many mills, rice scrub up from Bình Tây to Bình Đông.

The Tàu Hủ Canal is used for transporting cargo ships through Southern Vietnam. This canal was dug because there was no large waterway running through Ho Chi Minh City.

== See more ==
Translate from paragraph 3,4: *Read more
