= District 8, Ho Chi Minh City =

District 8 Quận 8
- Urban district
- Position in HCMC's core

- Location within Vietnam
- Coordinates: 10°43′24″N 106°37′40″E
- Country: Vietnam
- Centrally governed city: Ho Chi Minh City
- Seat: 4 Phạm Thế Hiển
- Wards: 16

Area
  - Total: 19 km^{2} (7.3 sq mi)

Population (2018)
  - Total: 451,290
  - Density: 24,000/km^{2} (62,000/sq mi)

Demographics
  - Main ethnic groups: predominantly Kinh
- Time zone: UTC+07 (ICT)
- Website: quan8.hochiminhcity.gov.vn

District 8 (Vietnamese: Quận 8) is a former urban district (quận) of Ho Chi Minh City, the largest city in Vietnam.

It is divided into 16 small subsets called wards (phường), numbered from Ward 1 to Ward 16.

== Geographical location ==
District 8 borders District 5 and District 6 to the north, District 4 and District 7 to the east, Bình Chánh District to the south, and Bình Tân District to the west.

District 8 coordinate: 10.7241° N, 106.6286° E

The district has an area of 19.11 km^{2}, the population in 2019 was 424,667 people, the population density reached 22,222 people/km^{2}.

It has an elongated shape in the northeast–southwest direction and is strongly divided by an intricate system of canals.
