= Declared monuments of Ho Chi Minh City =

Declared monuments of Ho Chi Minh City are structures and places that are listed to be protected.

== Monuments ==
=== District 1 ===
Name	Image	Declaration date	Location	Description	Coordinates	References
Municipal Theatre		2009	No. 7, Lam Sơn Square, Bến Nghé Ward			
Independence Palace		25/07/1976	No. 135, Nam Kỳ Khởi Nghĩa Street, Bến Nghé Ward	Now serves as Reunification Hall Museum.		
Gia Long Palace		2012	No. 65, Lý Tự Trọng Street, Bến Nghé Ward	Now serves as Ho Chi Minh City Museum.		
Museum of Vietnamese History		2012	No. 2, Nguyễn Bỉnh Khiêm Street, Bến Nghé Ward		lat = 10.78484, lon = 106.70759	
Temple of the Jade Emperor		15/10/1994	No. 73, Mai Thị Lựu Street, Tân Định Ward			

=== District 5 ===
Name	Image	Declaration date	Location	Description	Coordinates	References
Minh Hương Gia Thạnh Assembly Hall		07/01/1993	No. 380, Trần Hưng Đạo Boulevard, 11th Ward (now Chợ Lớn Ward)			
Nhị Phủ Miếu		30/08/1998	No. 264, Hải Thượng Lãn Ông Street, 14th Ward			
Thiên Hậu Temple		07/01/1993	No. 710, Nguyễn Trãi Street, Chợ Lớn Ward (now Chợ Lớn Ward)			
Lệ Châu Assembly Hall		30/08/1998	No. 586, Trần Hưng Đạo Boulevard, 14th Ward (now Chợ Lớn Ward)			
Hà Chương Assembly Hall		28/12/2001	No. 802, Nguyễn Trãi Street, 14th Ward (now Chợ Lớn Ward)			
Quan Âm Pagoda		27/04/2004	No. 12, Lão Tử Street, 11th Ward (now Chợ Lớn Ward)			

=== District 11 ===
Name	Image	Declaration date	Location	Description	Coordinates	References
Giác Viên Temple		07/01/1993	No. 161/85/20, Lạc Long Quân Street, 3rd Ward (now Bình Thới Ward)			
Phụng Sơn Temple		16/11/1988	No. 1408, February 3rd Boulevard, 2nd Ward (now Bình Thới Ward)			

=== District of Bình Thạnh ===
Name	Image	Declaration date	Location	Description	Coordinates	References
Tomb of Lê Văn Duyệt		06/12/1989	No. 1, Vũ Tùng Street, 1st Ward (now Gia Định Ward)			
Bình Hòa Communal House		07/01/1993	No. 15/77, Chu Văn An Street, 12th Ward (now Bình Thạnh Ward)			
