= Thien Hau Temple of Cholon =

Chinese-style temple in Ho Chi Minh City, Vietnam

Thiên Hậu Temple
- Chùa Bà Thiên Hậu; Hội quán Tuệ Thành (穗城會館)
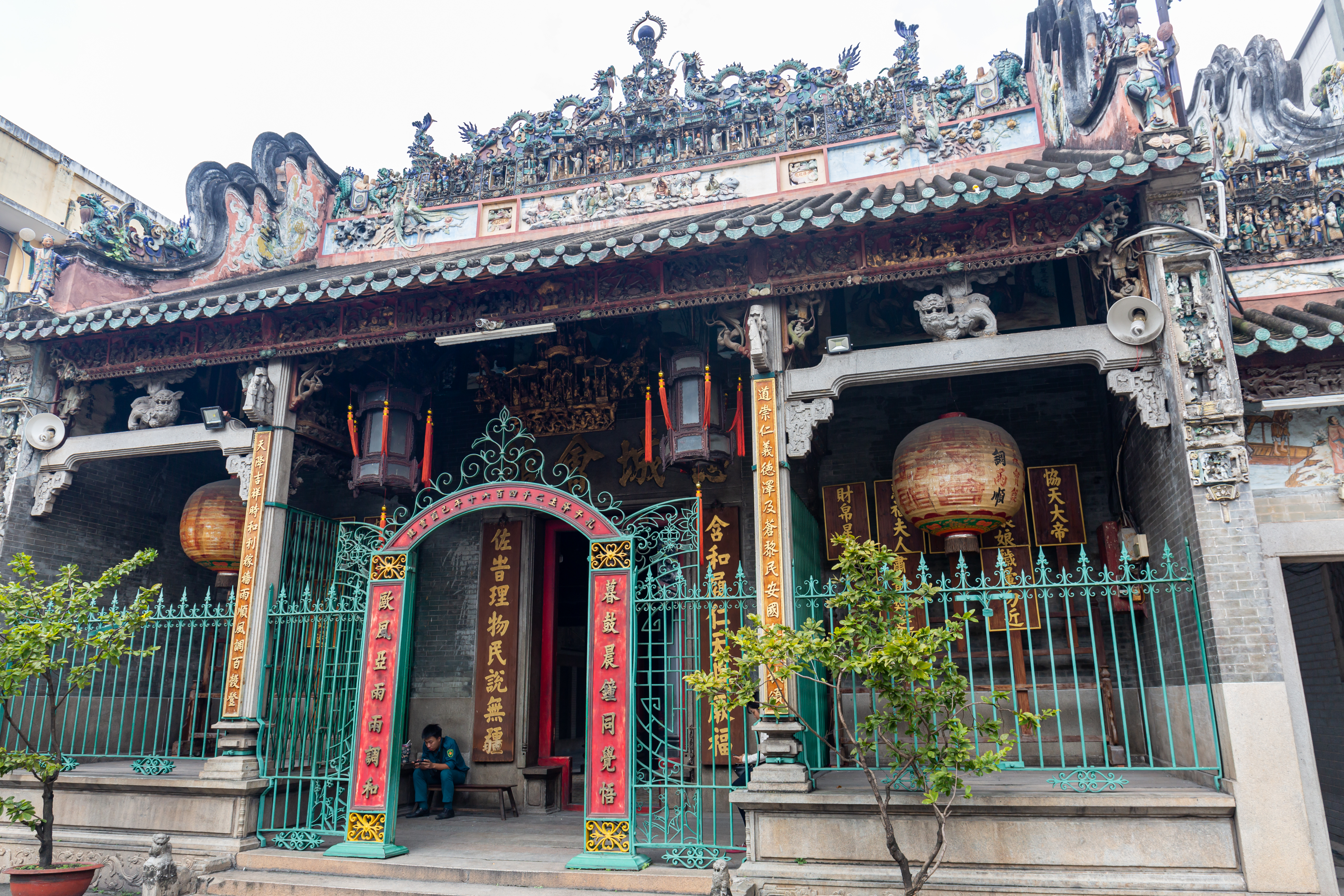

Religion
- Affiliation: Chinese folk religion
- Deity: Mazu as the "Queen of Heaven"

Location
- Location: Cholon; Chợ Lớn ward, Ho Chi Minh City
- Country: Vietnam
- Interactive map of Thiên Hậu Temple
- Coordinates: 10°45′10.48″N 106°39′40.22″E

Architecture
- Creator: Chinese community of Cholon
- Completed: c. 1760

The Thiên Hậu Temple (Vietnamese: Miếu Thiên Hậu), officially the Tuệ Thành Assembly Hall (Hội quán Tuệ Thành, Chinese: 穗城會館) is a Chinese-style temple of the Chinese Goddess of Sea, Mazu on Nguyễn Trãi Street in the Chợ Lớn ward of Ho Chi Minh City, Vietnam.

== History ==
Thiên Hậu is the Vietnamese transcription of the Chinese name Tianhou ("Empress of Heaven"), an epithet of the Chinese Goddess of Sea, Mazu, the deified form of Lin Moniang, a medieval Fujianese shamaness credited with saving one or some of her family members from harm during a typhoon through her spiritual power. The faith is popular in the maritime southern provinces of China and, especially, on Taiwan and among the Chinese diaspora. In Vietnam, she is also sometimes known as the "Lady of the Sea" (Tuc Goi La Ba). Mazuism is featured in both Taoism and Chinese Buddhism. For example, at the Quan Am Pagoda nearby, the two main altars are dedicated to Thien Hau and Quan Am, the Vietnamese form of Guanyin, the Chinese form of the bodhisattva Avalokiteshvara.

The temple was first erected c. 1760 by the Cantonese community in the city. It saw major repairs or expansions in 1800, 1842 (and possibly also 1847), 1882, 1890, and 1916.

== Architecture ==
=== Exterior ===
The temple is located on Nguyễn Trãi Street. It can be accessed by entering through an iron gate and crossing a small courtyard. The roof is decorated with small delicately fashioned porcelain figurines expressing themes from Chinese religion and legends. Lanterns and wooden models of Chinese theaters hang over the entrance.

=== Interior ===
The interior of the temple is actually a partially covered courtyard, at the end of which is the altar to Mazu. The exposed portions of the courtyard contain incense burners, and open the view to the remarkable porcelain dioramas that decorate the roof. The dioramas show scenes from a 19th-century Chinese city, and include such colorful figures as actors, demons, animals, and Persian and European sailors and traders. In one scene, actors depict a duel on horseback battle between the revered halberd-wielding general Guan Yu of the Three Kingdoms period and another fighter. Another scene depicts the three Taoist Immortal Sages representing longevity, fecundity and prosperity.

The altar to Mazu is dominated by the three statues of the Goddess. The faces are bronze in color, and the clothes and crowns are multi-colored. Incense burners are all about.

=== Gallery ===
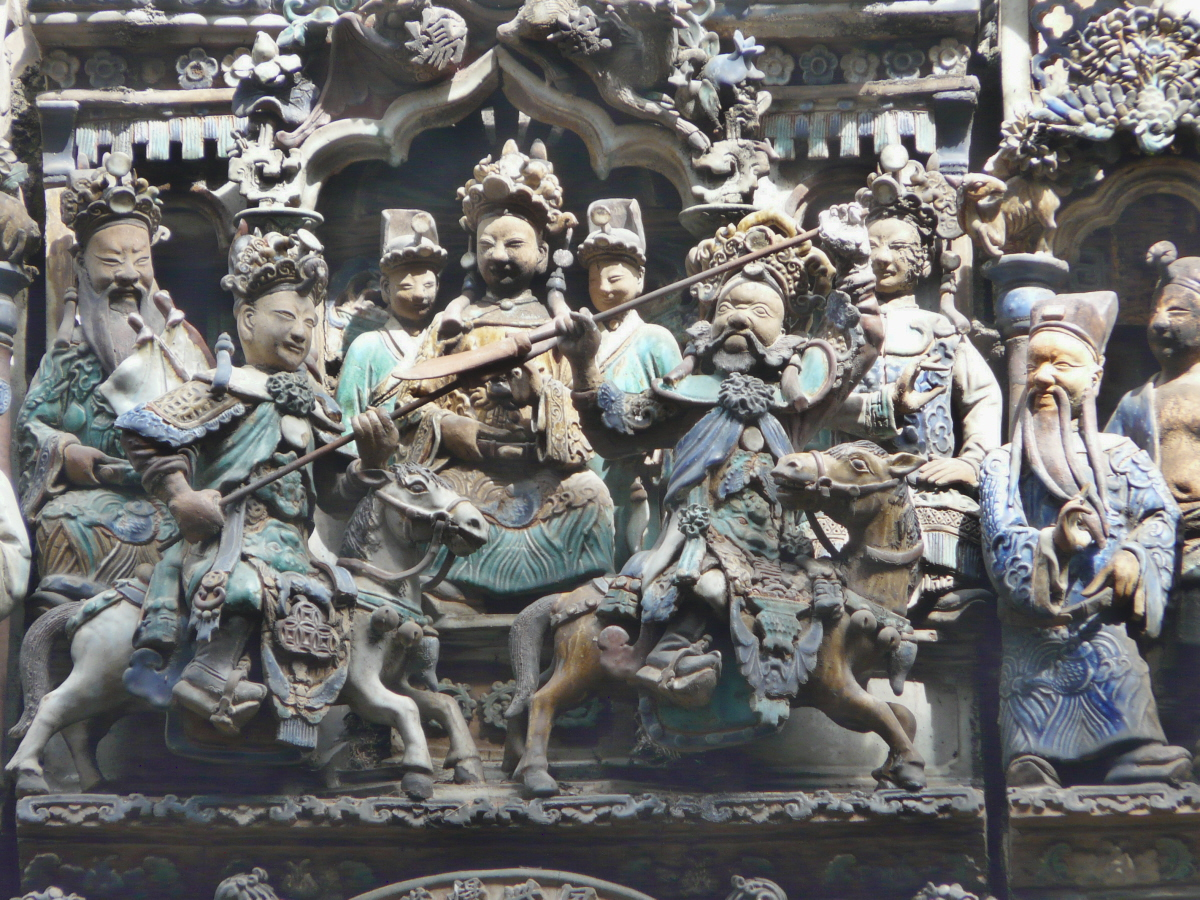
A scene from the roof of the temple shows actors depicting a duel between Guan Yu and another fighter

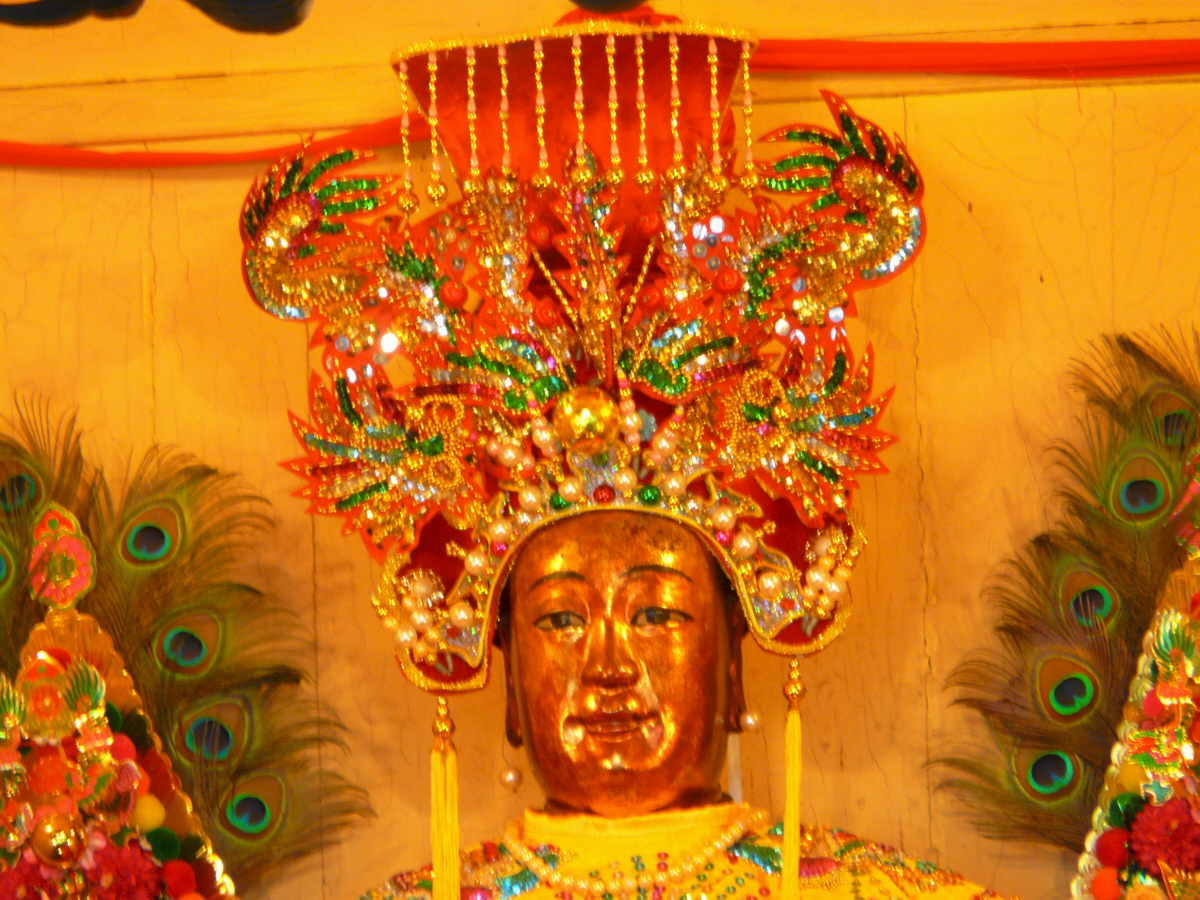
This image of Mazu dominates the temple's main altar

== Services ==
On the 23rd day of the third month of the Vietnamese lunar calendar which is Mazu's Birthday, the main statue of Mazu will be invite out from the altar and paraded through District 5's Chinatown. The temple's large bronze bell dates to 1830 and is rung when large donations are made to the temple.
