= Chợ Lớn (ward) =

Chợ Lớn Phường Chợ Lớn (Vietnamese) 堤岸坊 (Chinese)
- Ward
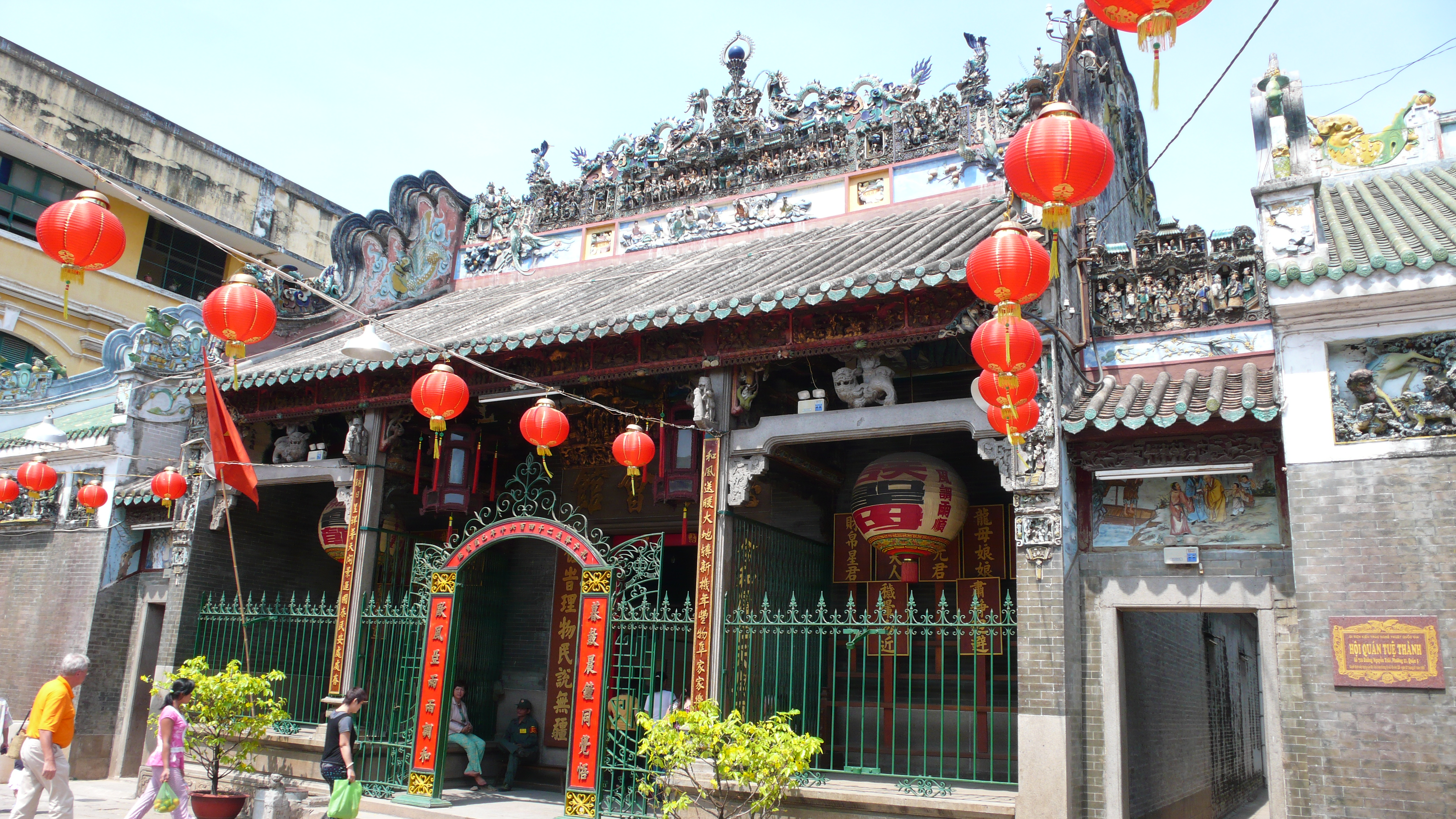
- Thiên Hậu Temple

- Location in Ho Chi Minh City

- Location in Vietnam
- Coordinates: 10°45′07″N 106°39′32″E
- Country: Vietnam
- Municipality: Ho Chi Minh City
- Established: 1 July 2025
- People's Committee Headquarters: 131 Triệu Quang Phục St.
- People's Council Headquarters: 209 An Dương Vương St.

Government
  - Party Secretary: Huỳnh Ngọc Nữ Phương Hồng
  - Leader of People's Committee: Nguyễn Xuân Trung
  - Leader of People's Council: Huỳnh Ngọc Nữ Phương Hồng
  - Leader of Vietnam Fatherland Front Council: Võ Minh Triết

Area
  - Total: 0.64 sq mi (1.67 km^{2})

Population (2024)
  - Total: 85,066
  - Density: 131.93/sq mi (50.937/km^{2})
- Time zone: UTC+07:00 (Indochina Time)
- Administrative code: 27343

Chợ Lớn (Vietnamese: Phường Chợ Lớn; Chinese: 堤岸坊 (Note: Sino-Vietnamese reading: Đê Ngạn phường Pinyin reading: Dī'àn Fáng or Dī'àn Fāng Jyutping reading: tai^{4} ngon^{6} fong^{1})), is a ward of Ho Chi Minh City, Vietnam. It is one of the 168 new wards, communes and special zones of the city following the 2025 Vietnamese administrative reforms under Resolution No. 1685/NQ-UBTVQH15 of the Standing Committee of the National Assembly of Vietnam.

== Etymology ==
The name Chợ Lớn (lit. 'big market') is exclusively used among the majority of Vietnamese speakers to refer to both the official ward and the unofficial quarter.

The name originated from two markets in the Chợ Lớn quarter, whose stark difference in size resulted in the larger & newer market being referred to as "Chợ Lớn" (lit. 'big market') to differentiate it from its smaller, older counterpart.

Among Chinese speakers, however, Chợ Lớn is instead referred to as '堤岸' (Pinyin: Dī'àn, Vietnamese: Đê ngạn), meaning 'embankment', and originates from a historic embankment associated with Chinese settlers in the area.

During the 2025 Vietnamese administrative reforms, "Chợ Lớn", in reference to the quarter, was chosen as the official name for the newly-established ward.

== History ==
The name "Chợ Lớn" began appearing on official records after the establishment of the "City of Chợ Lớn" (Ville de Cholon) on the 6th of June, 1865 by Pierre-Paul de La Grandière, interim Governor of Cochinchina (of which modern-day Chợ Lớn ward constituted only a portion). The former city also housed the government headquarters of then Chợ Lớn province, despite being two completely separate entities.

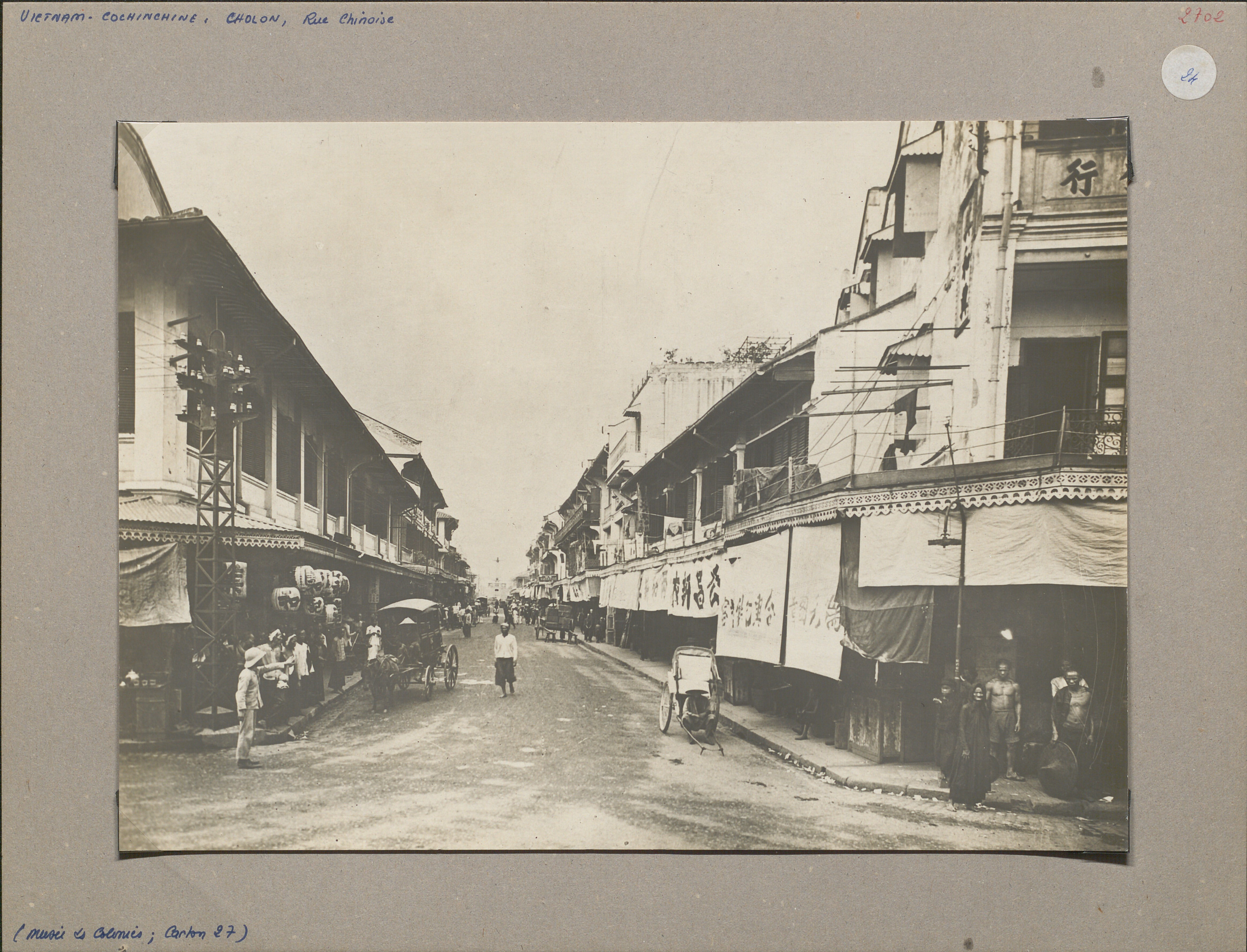
Gia Long Street, taken in the early 20th century (modern-day Trịnh Hoài Đức Street)

French censuses stated at the time that, in 1901, Chợ Lớn had a population of approximately 63,237. By February 1920, that number had risen to 93,949.

On the 27th of April, 1931, Chợ Lớn and the neighboring city of Saigon were merged to form a single administrative division called the "Saigon–Cholon Area" (Khu Sài Gòn – Chợ Lớn). The official name, however, never entered everyday vernacular speech and the city continued to be referred to as Saigon.

On the 30th of June, 1951, the Prime Minister of the State of Vietnam signed Decree No. 311-cab/SG, renaming the "Sài Gòn - Chợ Lớn Area" to the "Sài Gòn - Chợ Lớn Capital City" (Đô thành Sài Gòn-Chợ Lớn). In 1956, "Chợ Lớn" was dropped from the city's official name entirely.

By 1974, out of the eight archaic wards then located in District 5, it is said that the administrative territories of modern-day Chợ Lớn ward best resembles that of four, more specifically: Hồng Bàng, Khổng Tử, Nguyễn Trãi, and Trang Tử.

During the interim period under the Provisional Revolutionary Government of the Republic of South Vietnam from 1975 to 1976, the wards Hồng Bàng and Khổng Tử had been merged into Nguyễn Trãi and Trang Tử, respectively.

Chợ Lớn
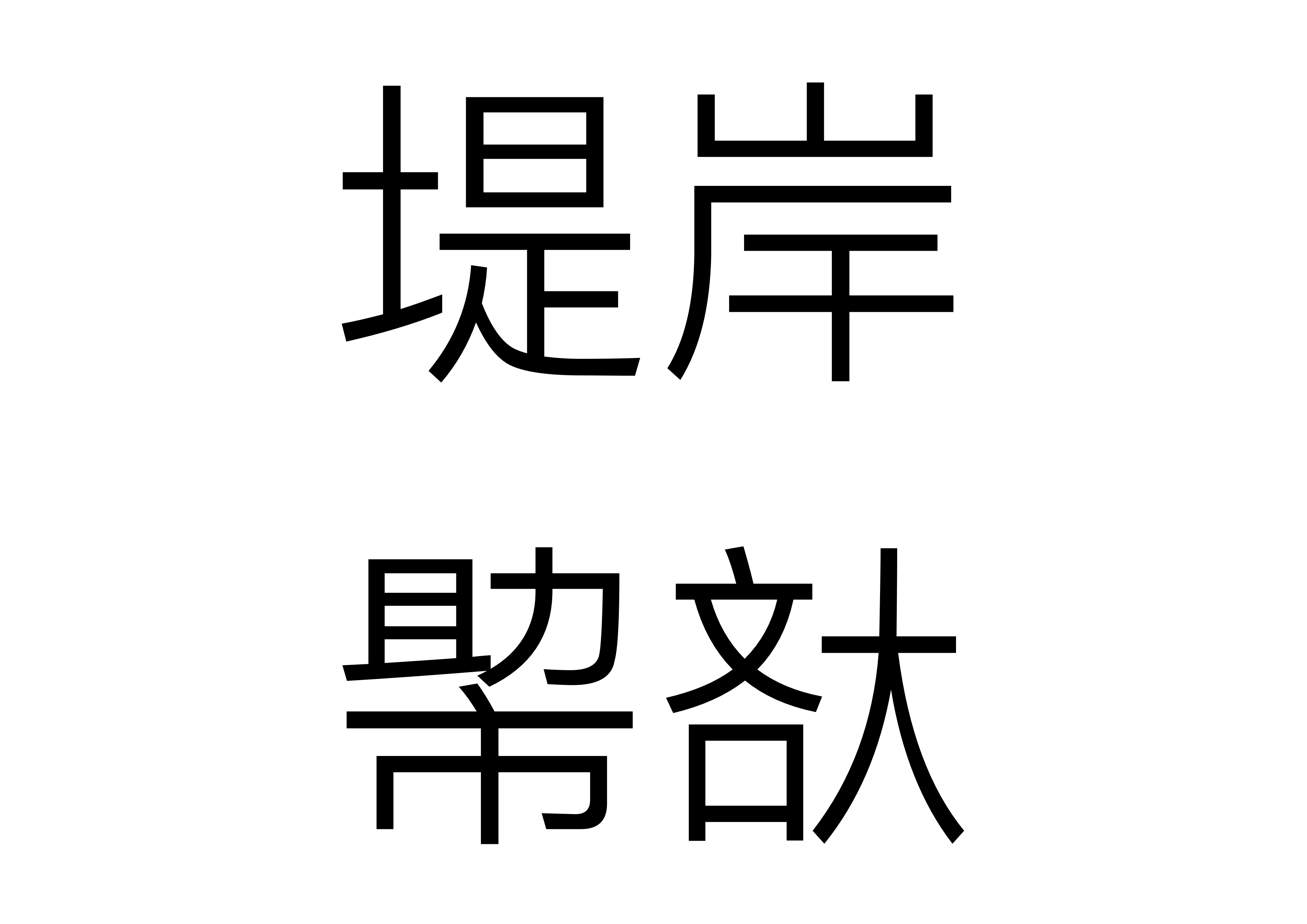
- "Đê Ngạn" and "Chợ Lớn" as written in dialects of Chinese (top) and Vietnamese (bottom). Note that the script used for the below name is no longer used to write the Vietnamese language.

Chinese name
- Chinese: 堤岸
- Hanyu Pinyin: Dī'àn
- Literal meaning: embankment
Transcriptions
Standard Mandarin
- Hanyu Pinyin: Dī'àn
- Wade–Giles: Ti^{1}an^{4}
- IPA: [tíˈân]
Hakka
- Romanization: Tiˇ ngan
Yue: Cantonese
- Yale Romanization: Tàihngohn
- Jyutping: tai^{4}ngon^{6}

Vietnamese name
- Vietnamese alphabet: Chợ Lớn
- Hán-Nôm: 𢄂𡘯

On the 26 April 1986, the Vietnamese Council of Ministers enacted Decision No. 51-HĐBT (on the rearragement of District 5's wards and its administrative boundaries), which resulted in the dissolution of 7 wards: 1, 2, 3, 4, 5, 6, and 10 in favor of 4 new wards: '12', '13', '14', and '15'. The newly-founded Ward 12 had a population of 6,139 across 36 neighborhoods (tổ dân phố), while Ward 15 had a population of 13,483 across 82 neighborhoods.

On 9 December 2020, the Standing Committee of the National Assembly of Vietnam issued Resolution 1111/NQ-UBTVQH14 (on the rearrangement of district-level & commune-level administrative units). The resolution, which took effect on 1 January 2021, merged District 5's Ward 15 into Ward 12.

On 16 June 2025, the Standing Committee of the National Assembly further issued Resolution No. 1685/NQ-UBTVQH15 on the arrangement of commune-level administrative units of Ho Chi Minh City in 2025 (effective from 1 July 2025). Accordingly, the entire land area and population of wards 11, 12, 13, and 14 of the former District 5 were integrated into a new ward named Chợ Lớn (Clause 13, Article 1).

== Geography ==
Chợ Lớn is among the 7 wards located in the unofficial Chợ Lớn area. (Note: The rest being: Chợ Quán, An Đông, Bình Phú, Phú Lâm, Bình Tiên, and Bình Tây.) Chợ Lớn is bordered by wards Minh Phụng and Diên Hồng to the north by Nguyễn Chí Thanh Street, An Đông to the east by Ngô Quyền Street, Phú Định (along the Tàu Hủ Canal) to the south, and Bình Tây & Bình Tiên to the west (along the route of Nguyễn Thị Nhỏ – Trang Tử – Ngô Nhơn Tịnh).

=== Administrative divisions ===
Chợ Lớn is divided into 30 neighborhoods (khu phố) numbered from '1' to '30'.

== Demographics ==
According to Dispatch No. 2896/BNV-CQĐP ratified on 27 May 2025 by the Ministry of Home Affairs, Chợ Lớn has a total area of 1,67 km² (0.64 sq mi). Combined with a total population (as of 31 December 2024) of 85,066, Chợ Lớn has a total population density of approximately 50.947 people/km² (according to Article 6 of Resolution No. 76/2025/UBTVQH15 by the Standing Committee of the National Assembly).

== Culture ==
=== Religious sites ===
Religious sites in Chợ Lớn ward and the Chợ Lớn quarter predominantly consist of Chinese temples and "assembly halls / guild halls" (會館 / hội quán). Their prevalence likely stems from the concentration of religious sites in the area compared to the rest of Chợ Lớn quarter.

==== National relics ====
Name	Address	Notes
Minh Hương Gia Thạnh Communal House (明鄉嘉盛會館 (Note: In Sino-Vietnamese: Minh Hương Gia Thạnh Hội Quán) / Đình Minh Hương Gia Thạnh)	380 Trần Hưng Đạo	
Hà Chương Assembly Hall (霞漳會館 / Hội quán Hà Chương)	802 Nguyễn Trãi	
Lệ Châu Assembly Hall (麗朱會館 / Hội quán Lệ Châu)	586 Trần Hưng Đạo	
Ôn Lăng Assembly Hall (溫陵會館 / Hội quán Ôn Lăng)	12 Lão Tử	Also known as the Quan Âm Temple (Chùa Quân Âm)
Nghĩa An Assembly Hall (義安會館 / Hội quán Nghĩa An)	676 Nguyễn Trãi	
Nghĩa Nhuận Assembly Hall (義潤會館 / Hội quán Nghĩa Nhuận)	27 Phan Văn Khỏe	
Nhị Phủ Assembly Hall (二府會館 / Hội quán Nhị Phủ)	264 Hải Thượng Lãn Ông	
Quỳnh Phủ Assembly Hall (瓊府會館 / Hội quán Quỳnh Phủ)	276 Trần Hưng Đạo B	
Thien Hau Temple of Cholon (Miếu Thiên Hậu)	710 Nguyễn Trãi	Also known as Tuệ Thành Assembly Hall (穗城會館 / Hội quán Tuệ Thành)

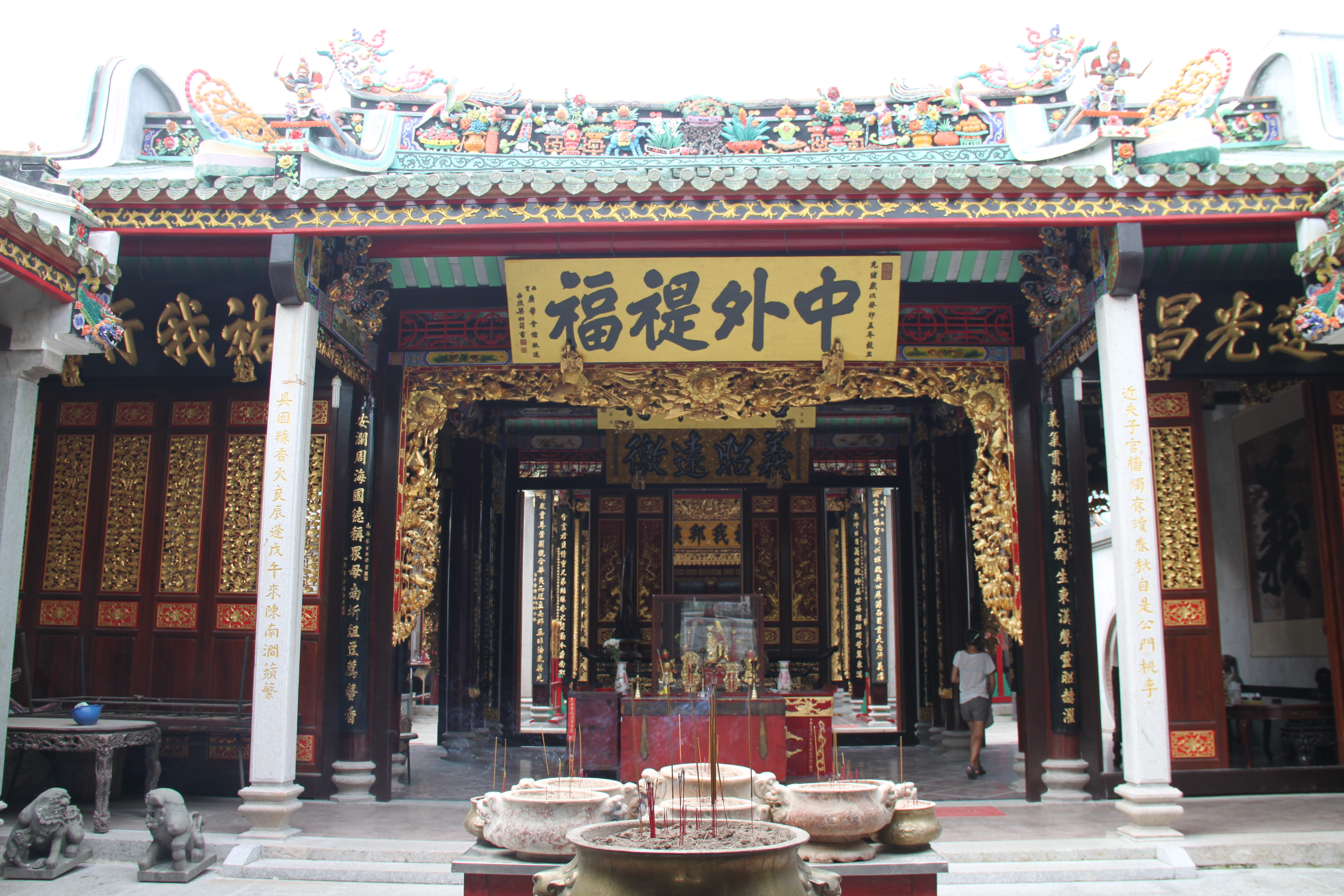
Nghĩa An Assembly Hall

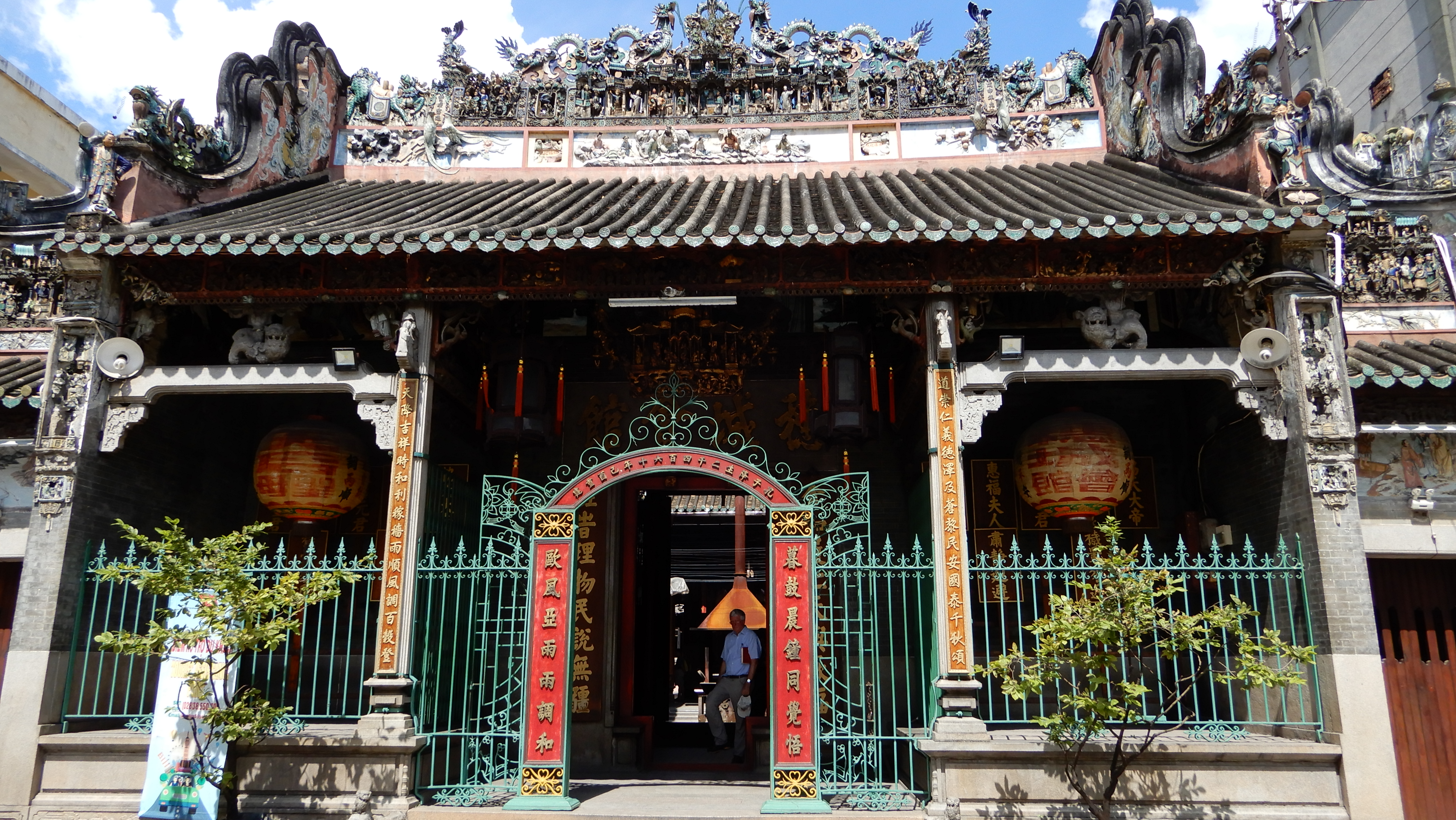
Thien Hau Temple of Cholon

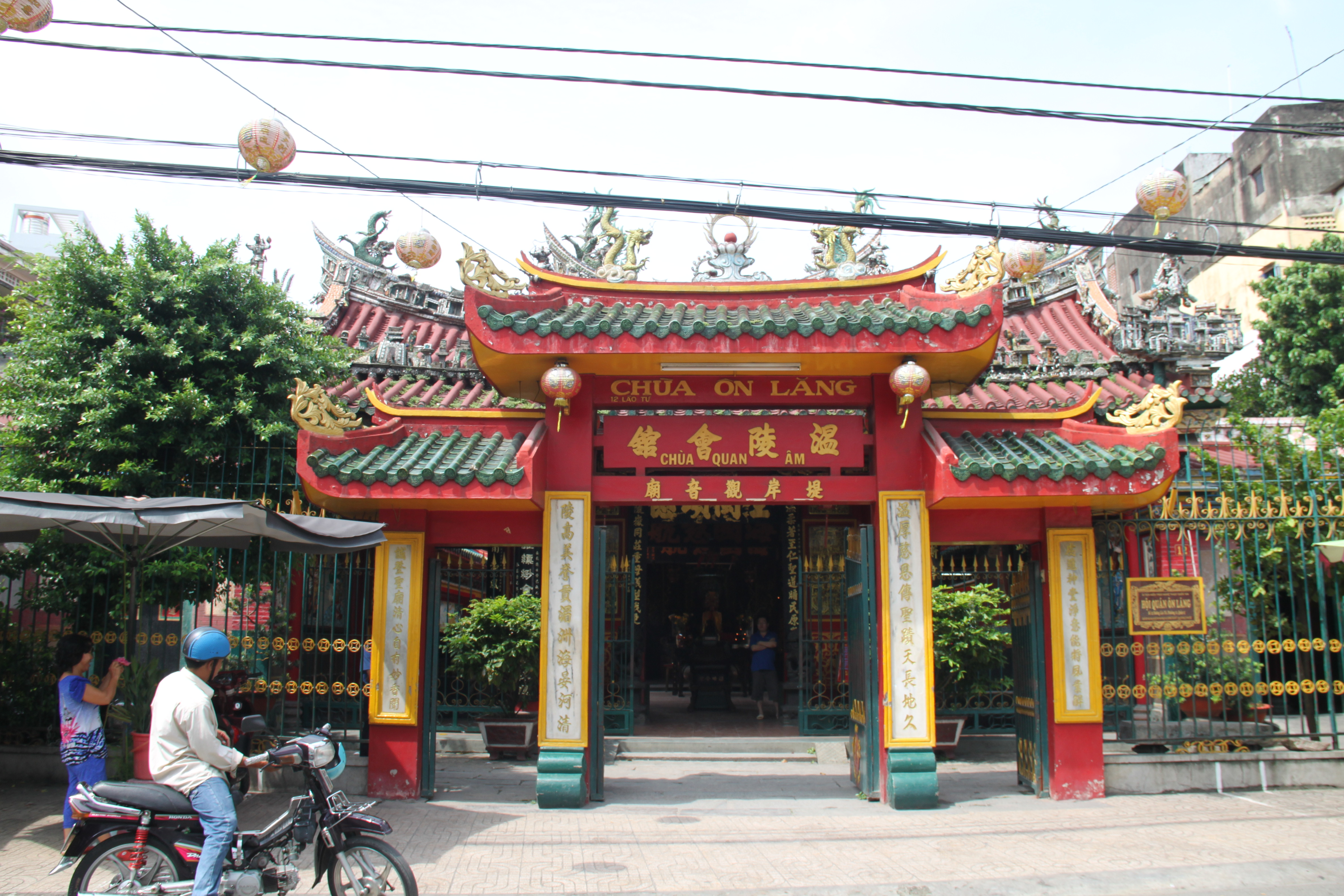
Ôn Lăng Assembly Hall

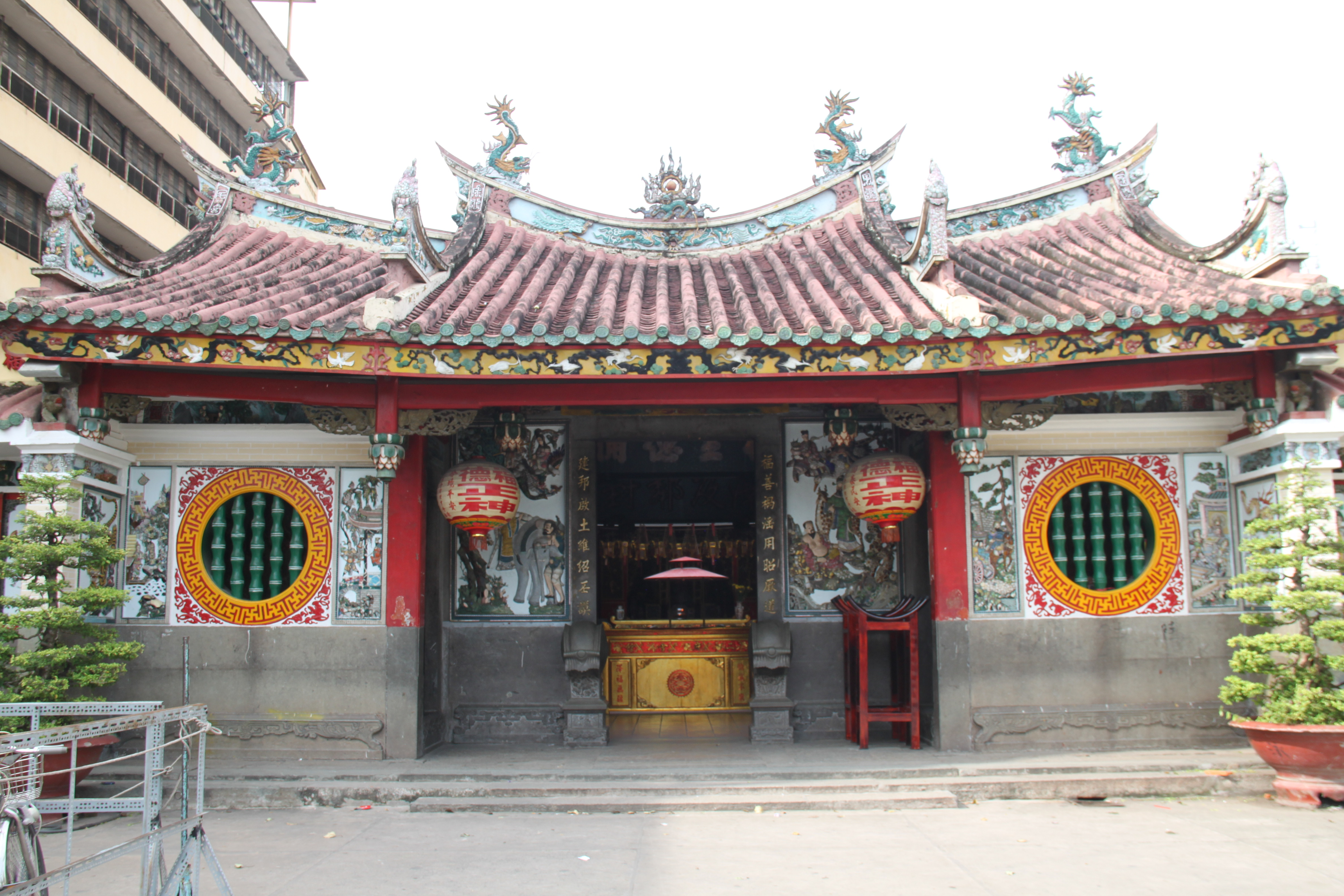
Nhị Phủ Assembly Hall

==== City-level relics ====
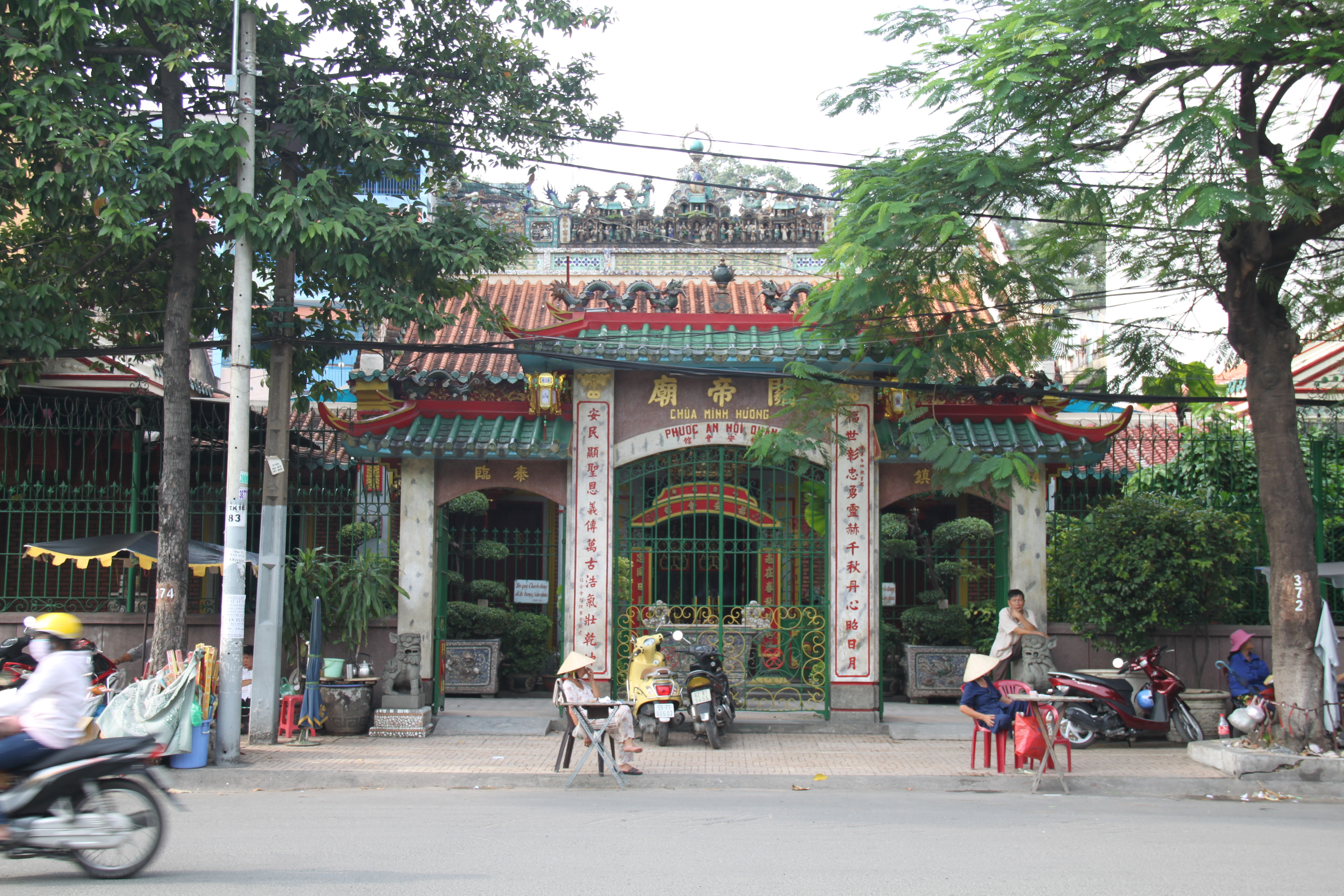
Phước An Assembly Hall

Name	Address	Notes
Phước An Assembly Hall (福安會館 / Hội quán Phước An)	184 Hồng Bàng	Also known as "Minh Hương Pagoda"
Lý Family Ancestral House (李氏祠堂 / Từ đường họ Lý)	292 Hải Thượng Lãn Ông	

==== Others ====
Name	Established	Address	Notes
Cholon Jamial Mosque (Thánh đường Hồi giáo Chợ Lớn)	1932	641 Nguyễn Trãi	Also known as "Masjid Al Jamia"

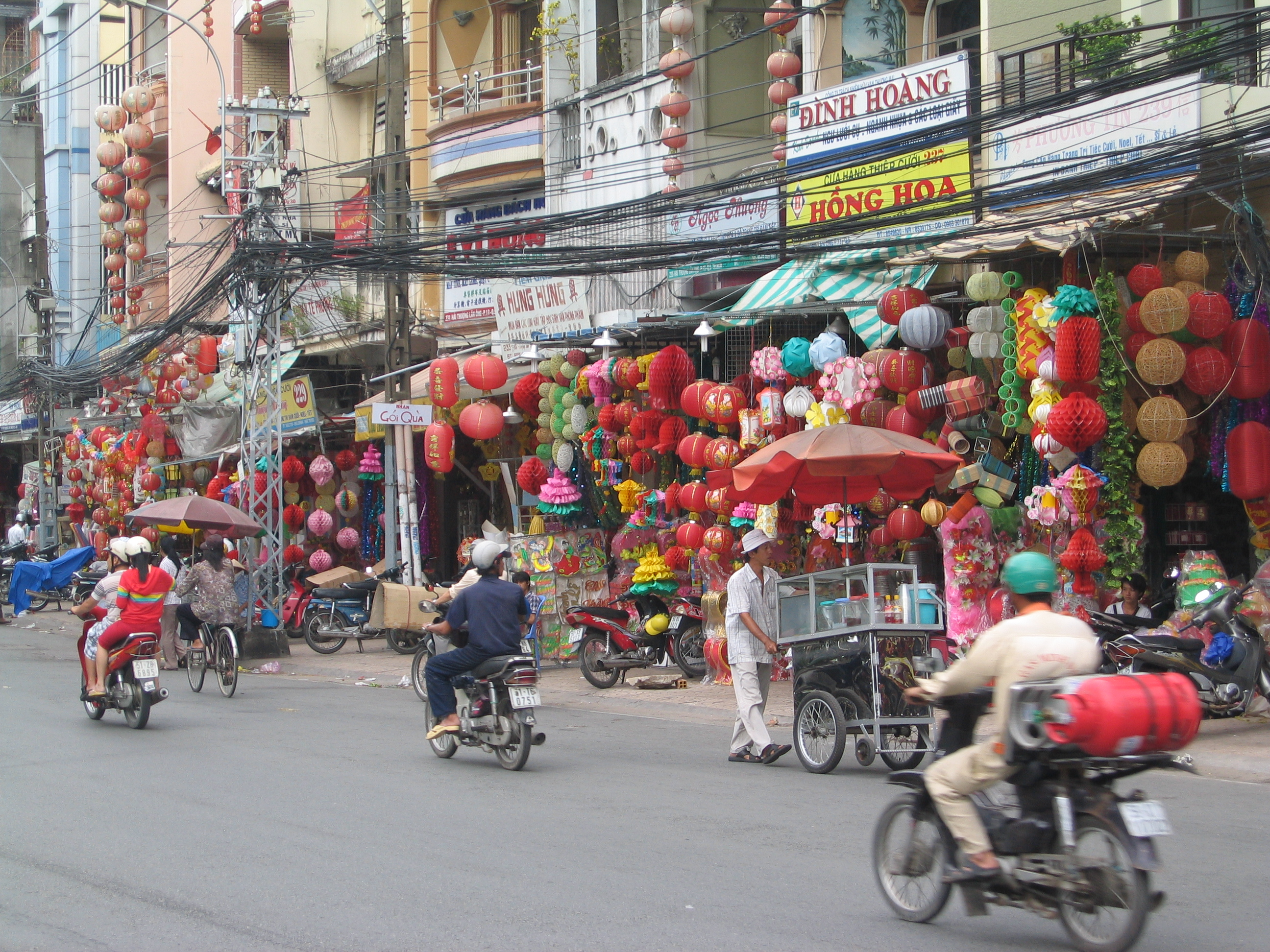
Hải Thượng Lãn Ông Old Street

=== Commerce ===
==== Commercial streets/areas (tuyến phố chuyên doanh) ====
Name	Address	Notes
Hải Thượng Lãn Ông Old Street (Khu phố cổ Hải Thượng Lãn Ông)	Hải Thượng Lãn Ông Boulevard	Recognized by the Ho Chi Minh City Department of Culture, Sports and Tourism as "one of the cities' oldest neighborhood blocks".
District 5 Traditional Medicine Street (Phố Đông y Quận 5)	Hải Thượng Lãn Ông Boulevard	
Phùng Hưng Stationery Street (Phố văn phòng phẩm Phùng Hưng)	Phùng Hưng Street	
District 5 Lantern Street (Phố lồng đèn Quận 5)	Lương Nhữ Học Street	

== Government ==
Headquarters	Address
The People's Committee of Chợ Lớn Ward	131 Triệu Quang Phúc St.
The Party Committee, People's Council & Vietnam Fatherland Front Committee of Chợ Lớn Ward	209 An Dương Vương St.
Public Administration Service Center of Chợ Lớn Ward	525-527 Hồng Bàng St.
People's Police of Chợ Lớn Ward	208 A-B-C-D Hồng Bàng St.
Military Command of Chợ Lớn Ward	40 Trịnh Hoài Đức St.

== Healthcare ==
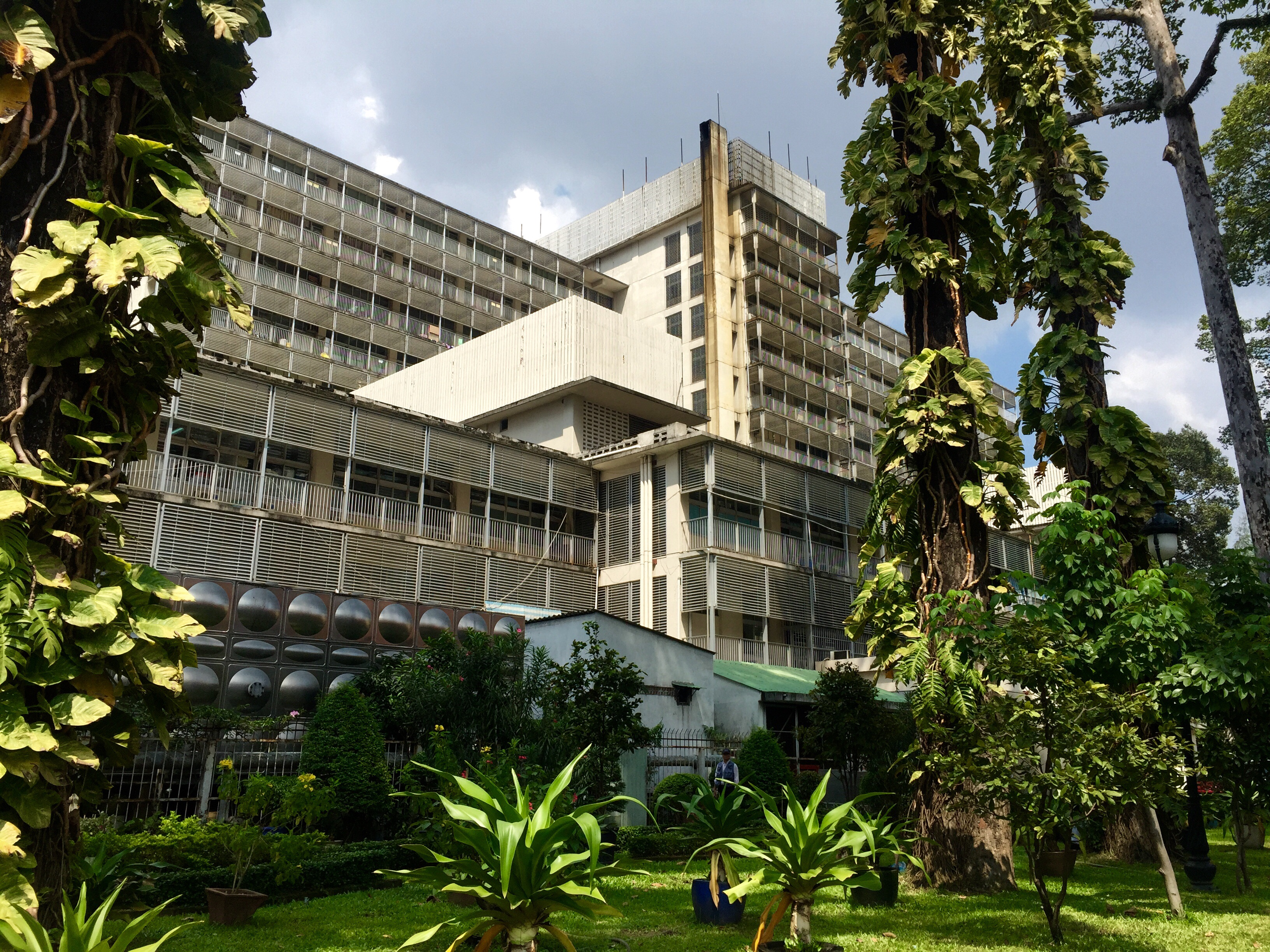
Chợ Rẫy Hospital

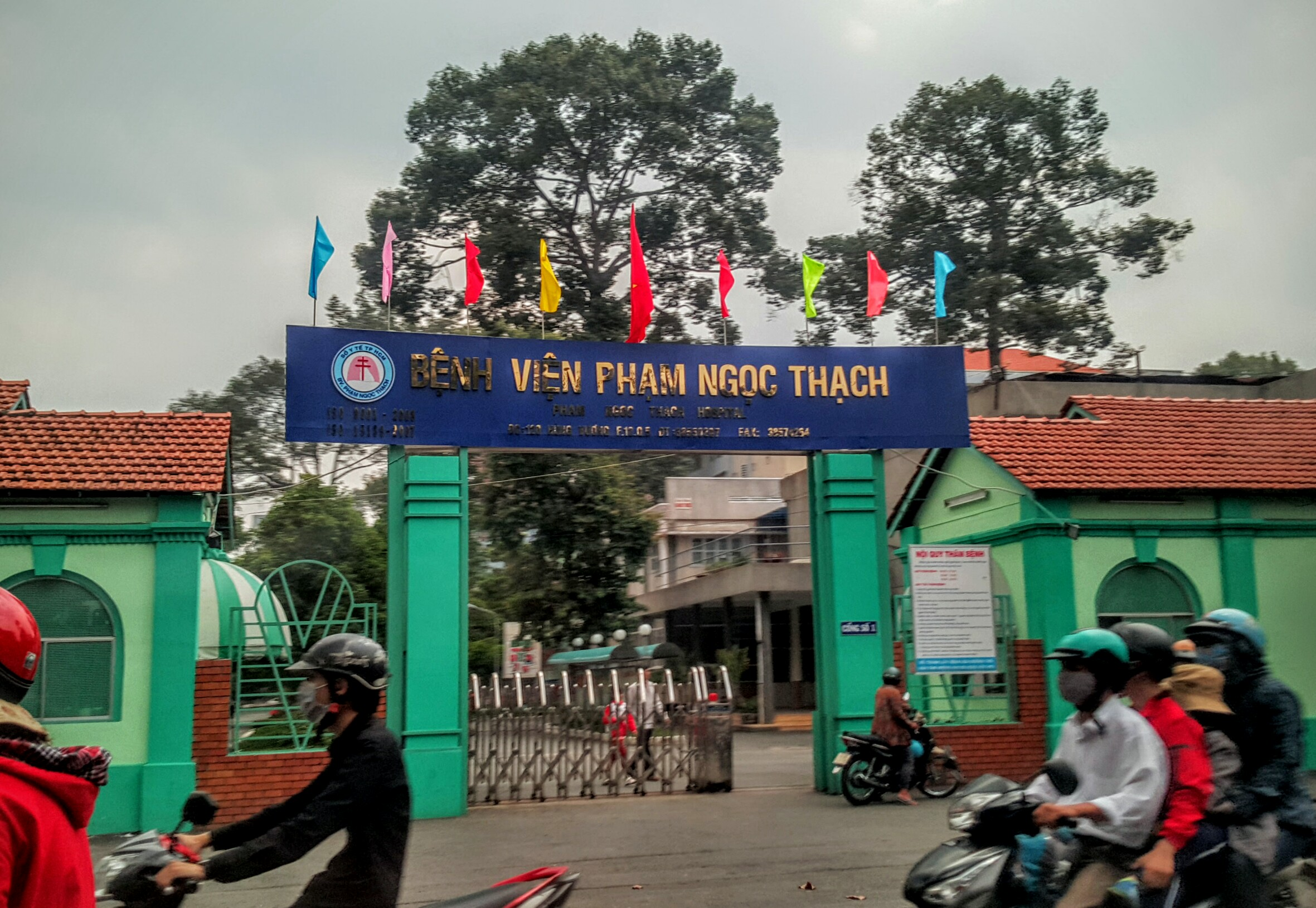
Phạm Ngọc Thạch Hospital

Name of hospital	Address	Notes
Chợ Rẫy Hospital (Bệnh viện Chợ Rẫy)	201B Nguyễn Chí Thanh	High specialized hospital
University of Medicine & Pharmacy Hospital (Bệnh viện Đại học Y Dược Thành phố Hồ Chí Minh)	215 Hồng Bàng	Campus 1
University of Medicine & Pharmacy Hospital (Bệnh viện Đại học Y Dược Thành phố Hồ Chí Minh)	201 Nguyễn Chí Thanh	Campus 2
Hùng Vương Hospital (Bệnh viện Hùng Vương)	128 Hồng Bàng	Central-level, Grade I specialized hospital for obstetrics and gynecology
Phạm Ngọc Thạch Hospital (Bệnh viện Phạm Ngọc Thạch)	120 Hồng Bàng	Tuberculosis and Lung Diseases Specialist hospital
District 5 Hospital (Bệnh viện Quận 5)	642A Nguyễn Trãi	Now is Chợ Lớn Regional Medical Center (Trung tâm Y tế Khu vực Chợ Lớn)
National Hospital of Odonto-Stomatology (NHOS) (Bệnh viện Răng Hàm Mặt Trung ương Thành phố Hồ Chí Minh)	201A Nguyễn Chí Thanh	
Blood Transfusion and Hermatology Hospital (BTH) (Bệnh viện Truyền máu - Huyết học Thành phố Hồ Chí Minh)	118 Hồng Bàng	

== Education ==
=== Higher education ===
==== Universities & pre-universities ====
Name of institution	Address	Website	Notes
Hùng Vương University, Ho Chi Minh City (DHV) (Trường Đại học Hùng Vương Thành phố Hồ Chí Minh)	736 Nguyễn Trãi		Main campus
Ho Chi Minh City University of Physical Education and Sport (UPES) (Trường Đại học Sư phạm Thể dục Thể thao Thành phố Hồ Chí Minh)	639 Nguyễn Trãi		
Ho Chi Minh City University of Medicine and Pharmacy (UMP) (Trường Đại học Y Dược Thành phố Hồ Chí Minh)	217 Hồng Bàng		

=== Vocational schools ===
Name of institution	Address	Website
Hùng Vương Technology Vocational School (Trường Trung cấp nghề Kỹ thuật công nghệ Hùng Vương)	161–165 Nguyễn Chí Thanh	

=== High schools (Trung học phổ thông), escalator schools offering high school education ===
Name of institution	Address	Website
Hùng Vương High School (Trường THPT Hùng Vương)	124 Hồng Bàng	
Trần Hữu Trang High School (Trường THPT Trần Hữu Trang)	276 Trần Hưng Đạo B	
Văn Lang Primary, Secondary & High School (Trường Tiểu học, THCS và THPT Văn Lang)	84 Tân Hưng	
Văn Lang Primary, Secondary & High School (Trường Tiểu học, THCS và THPT Văn Lang)	02 Tân Thạnh	

=== Secondary schools (Trung học cơ sở) ===
The following list does not include escalator schools which offer high school education.

Name of institution	Established in	Address	Website
Trần Bội Cơ Secondary School (Trường THCS Trần Bội Cơ)	1908	266 Hải Thượng Lãn Ông	
Hồng Bàng Secondary School (Trường THCS Hồng Bàng)		132 Hồng Bàng	
Mạch Kiếm Hùng Secondary School (Trường THCS Mạch Kiếm Hùng)		712 Nguyễn Trãi	

=== Primary schools (Trường tiểu học) ===
Name of institution	Address	Website
Lê Đình Chinh Primary School (Trường Tiểu học Lê Đình Chinh)	8–15 Vạn Tượng	
Hùng Vương Primary School (Trường Tiểu học Hùng Vương)	266 Hồng Bàng	
Lý Cảnh Hớn Primary School (Trường Tiểu học Lý Cảnh Hớn)	No. 2 Xóm Chỉ	
Chính Nghĩa Primary School (Trường Tiểu học Chính Nghĩa)	676 Nguyễn Trãi	
Minh Đạo Primary School (Trường Tiểu học Minh Đạo)	15 Ký Hòa	
Nguyễn Viết Xuân Primary School (Trường Tiểu học Nguyễn Viết Xuân)	768 Nguyễn Trãi	
Nguyễn Đức Cảnh Primary School (Trường Tiểu học Nguyễn Đức Cảnh)	25 Học Lạc	
