= Ôn Lăng Assembly Hall =

Buddhist temple in Ho Chi Minh City, Vietnam

Quan Am Temple
- Hội quán Ôn Lăng, Chùa Quan Âm, 溫陵會館
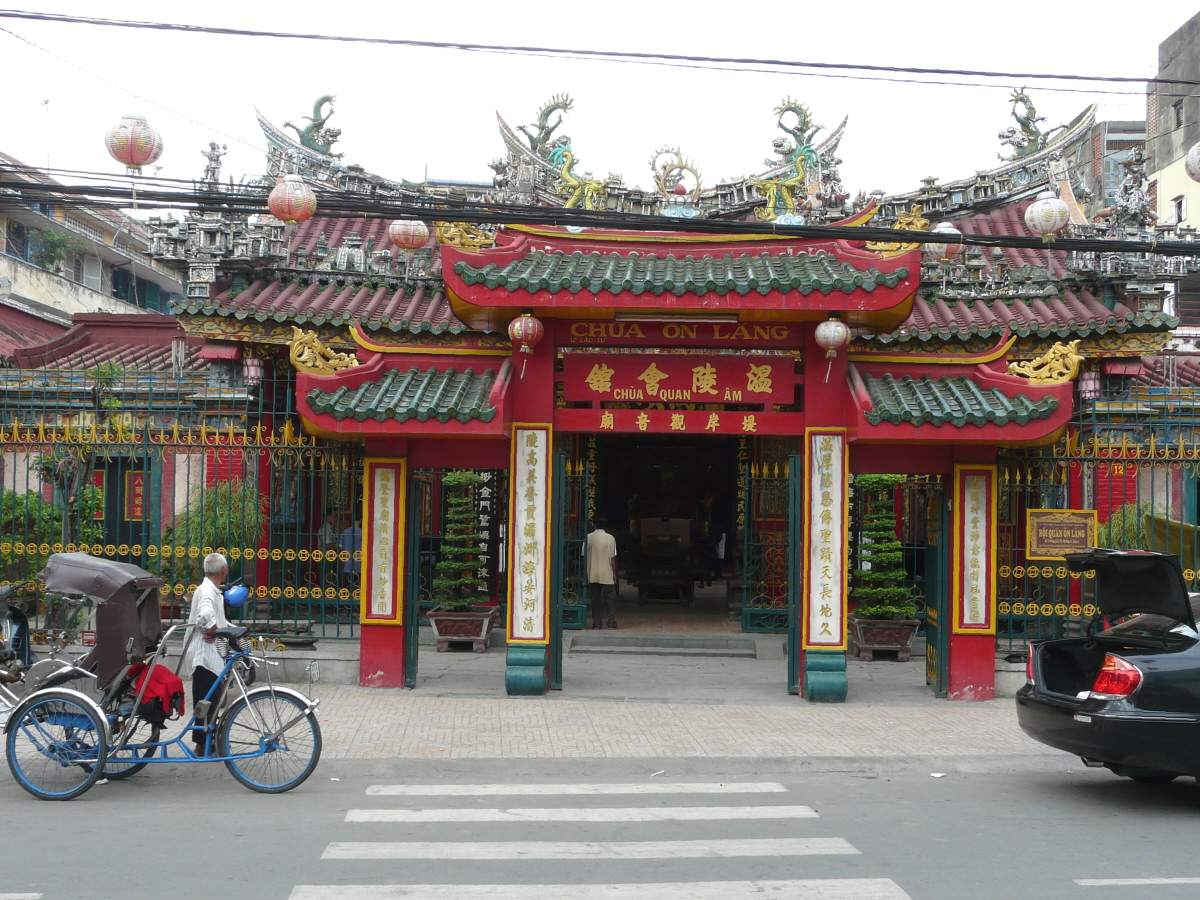

Religion
- Affiliation: Buddhist
- Province: Ho Chi Minh
- Deity: Quan Âm

Location
- Location: Chợ Lớn ward, Ho Chi Minh City
- Country: Vietnam
- Interactive map of Quan Am Temple
- Coordinates: 10.7541°N 106.6596°E

Architecture
- Creator: Chinese community of Cho Lon
- Completed: 19th century

The Ôn Lăng Assembly Hall (Hội quán Ôn Lăng / 溫陵會館), also known as the Quan Âm Temple (Chùa Quân Âm), is a Chinese-style Buddhist temple located on Lão Tử Street in Chợ Lớn ward, Ho Chi Minh City, Vietnam. Founded in the 19th century, it is dedicated to Guanyin (Vietnamese: Quan Âm), the Chinese goddess of mercy and the Chinese form of the Indian bodhisattva Avalokiteshvara.

The pagoda is popular among both Vietnamese and Chinese Buddhists; most of its inscriptions are in Chinese characters, but some have had Vietnamese labels added. In addition to veneration of Guanyin and the teachings of the Buddha, the pagoda also includes Pure Land worship of the Amitabha Buddha (A Di Da Phat), elements of Taoism, and the folk worship of the Fujianese sea goddess Mazu in her role as the "Queen of Heaven" (Thien Hau).

== History ==
The temple was built by Hokkien immigrants to the city in the late 19th century.

== Layout ==
On one side of Lao Tu Street is the pagoda complex, with an entrance through a gatehouse; on the other side is an associated garden with an artificial pond. The pagoda complex itself consists of a small front courtyard, an antechamber with an altar to the Jade Emperor, a main chamber with an altar to Mazu, and a large rear courtyard dominated by the statue of Guanyin.

=== Grounds ===
The garden, which is separated from the street by a red metal gate, contains an artificial pond and fountain. In the middle is a miniature scale artificial island with rocky terrain and a roofed pavilion. A Chinese-style statue of Guanyin stands on the stone border to the little pond. Guanyin is standing erect on a lotus flower. She is wearing a crown and a long white robe. With her right hand, she holds a small golden pearl, while with the left she holds a small vial. This vial contains the elixir of life, amrita. The relief images on the three panels surrounding the pond depict Taoist motifs.

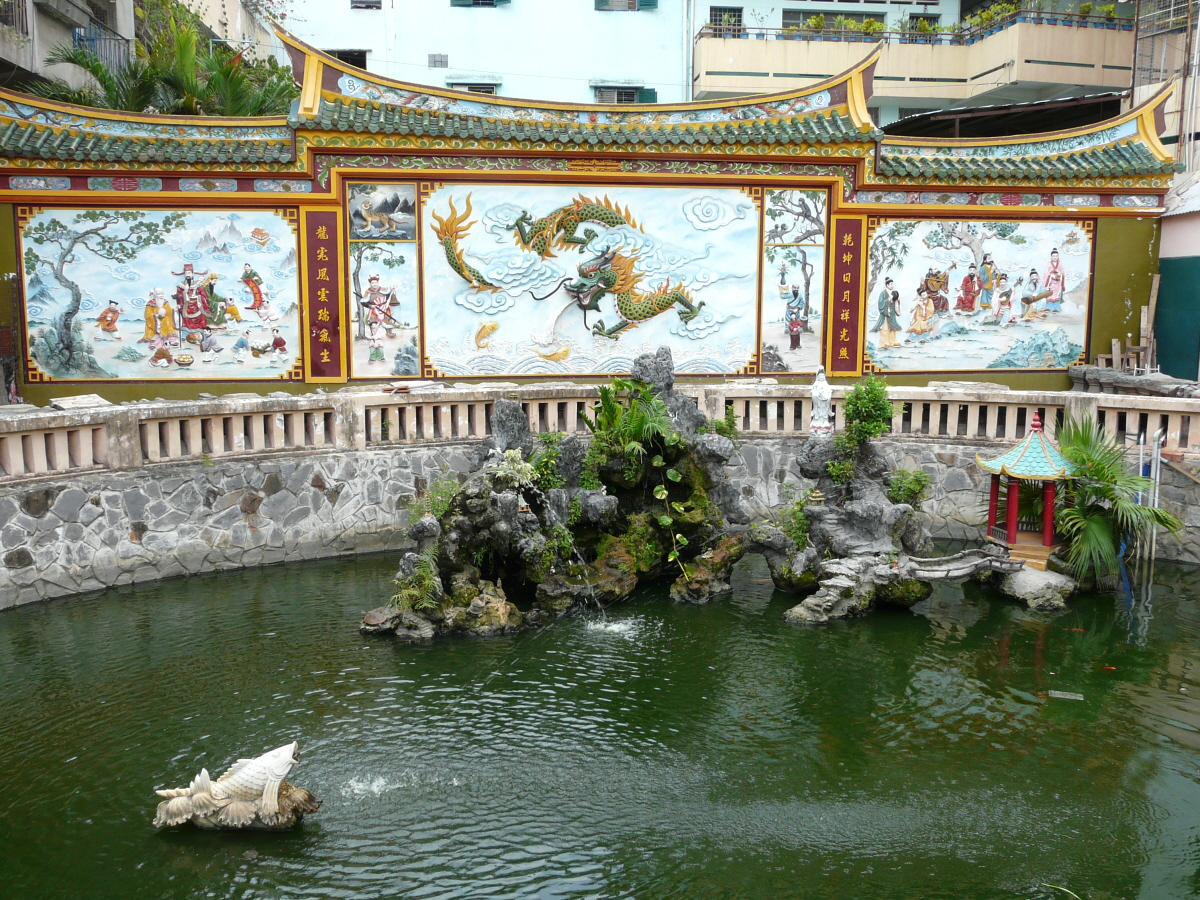
The relief panels surrounding the artificial pond have Taoist motifs.

In the center panel, a green dragon, his body partially obscured by clouds, hovers above the ocean waters, while golden fish play at the surface.

In the leftmost panel, the three divinities that represents the Three Stars (Phước Lộc Thọ) are standing together in Heaven. The Status Star (Lộc) is dressed as a Chinese mandarin, wearing a red robe with light blue trim. The Longevity Star (Thọ) is depicted as an old man with a white beard and a yellow robe. In his right hand, he is carrying a peach, the symbol of immortality, while in his left hand he carries a wooden staff with the head of a dragon. The Jade Emperor and Lao-tze are surrounded by children who are gathering the peaches of immortality and placing them in baskets and a wagon. One child presents a basket of peaches to Lao-tze, as the Jade Emperor looks on and touches his beard. Behind the deity of status stands the deity that's associated with prosperity star, who is stroking the head of one of the children.

In the rightmost panel, a group of eight musicians are depicted making music in a natural setting. The instruments include flutes, percussion, and strings.

=== Front Courtyard ===
The entrance to the pagoda across the street from the garden is through a small red gatehouse. Between the gatehouse and the pagoda building itself is a narrow courtyard. At both ends of the narrow courtyard are relief panels fashioned in the same style as the panels in the garden across the street. The difference is that while the panels in the garden have Taoist motifs, those in the courtyard have Buddhist motifs depicting the Pure Land of Amitabha Buddha.

Amitabha is the Buddha associated with the form of Buddhist piety that promises salvation through faith. It is a form of piety available even to those who lack the ability or opportunity to pursue salvation through meditation and reflection. Devotees of Amitabha call his name in all sincerity, and he rewards them by having them reborn into the paradise that is called the Pure Land, a place without suffering and without evil, where sentient beings can prepare themselves for ultimate salvation.

To the left of the main entrance of to the pagoda complex is a panel depicting Amitabha Buddha as he presides over the Pure Land.

- Amitabha is depicted sitting cross-legged on a lotus flower. He is wearing robes of red and orange. He has the elongated ears and curled hair of the Shakyamuni Buddha (i.e., the Buddha), and his head is surrounded by a halo of fire. His right hand makes the gesture of fearlessness, and his left hand the gesture of giving. He is flanked by two standing bodhisattvas, who prayerfully clasp their hands at their chests. They are Avalokitesvara Bodhisattva (Quán Thế Âm Bồ Tát) and Mahasthamaprapta Bodhisattva (Đại Thế Chí Bồ Tát). These two bodhisattvas are Amitabha's companions in the principal iconographic triad of Pure Land Buddhism. Surrounding Ambitabha and the bodhisattvas are numerous monks and devotees. Most of the monks are dressed in orange robes, with short-cropped greyish hair.

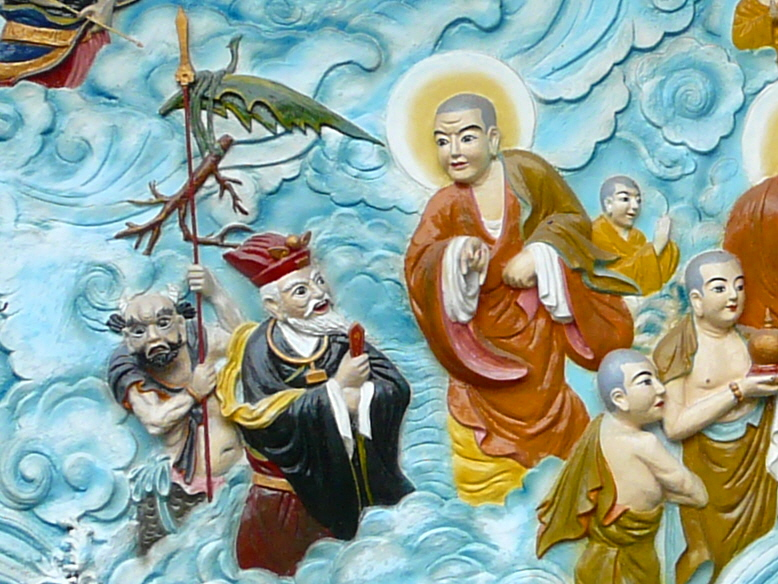
A bodhisattva converses with the spirit of the land.

- To Ambitabha's right are a group of figures.
  - The spirit of the land on which the pagoda was built has a white beard and black and red robes; a horned demon protects him from the sun by means of an umbrella made of a gigantic leaf. The spirit of the land is conversing with a bodhisattva, who appears to be coming from the entourage surrounding Amitabha.
  - Behind the spirit of the land are a novice monk, dressed in grey, and an azure dragon.
  - Somewhat above the spirit of the land, emerging from some clouds, is a dark-skinned four-armed archer, with fierce bulging eyes and thick black eyebrows. With two of his hands, the archer fits an arrow to his bow; with the other two, he gesticulates above his head. A small light-skinned head grows upwards from the darker head below.

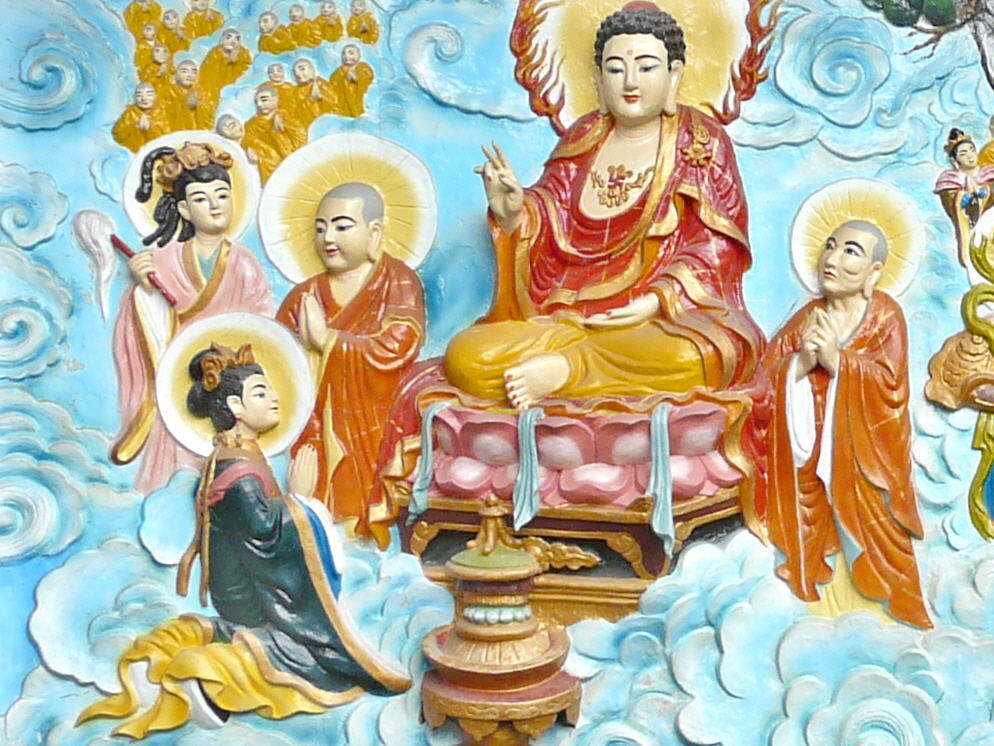
Amitabha blesses a female devotee.

To the right of the main entrance is another panel depicting Amitabha presiding over the Pure Land. Again, Amitabha is depicted sitting on a lotus throne, and wearing red and orange clothing. Again he is flanked by two standing boddhisattvas with clasped hands. Amitabha's left hand rests in his lap in the gesture of meditation, while his right hand is raised in a benevolent gesture towards a haloed woman who kneels at his feet. To Amitabha's left, a diverse crowd of figures emerges from the clouds surrounding a mountainous wilderness landscape. About half the figures are monks clad in orange robes; the rest include two bearded men in armor, one playing a lute and the other carrying a sword, and a man leading a harnessed tiger.

=== Entry Hallway and Altar to Jade Emperor ===
The partially covered entry hallway is dominated by a central altar to the Jade Emperor (Ngoc Hoang), which faces a large incense censer. The wall to the right of the altar features a large relief depiction of a tigress with her cub, a symbol of fertility, and the wall to the left a golden dragon swirling through the clouds. Gilded panels of the male Amitabha Buddha and three female Bodhisattvas (Bo Tat) mounted on mythical creatures flank the reliefs.

- Amitabha Buddha (A Di Da Phat) sits cross legged on the back of a fierce lion or qilin (sometimes called a "unicorn" in English translation). His right hand rests in his lap in the gesture of meditation, cradling a lotus flower. His left hand is raised in a gesture of instruction.

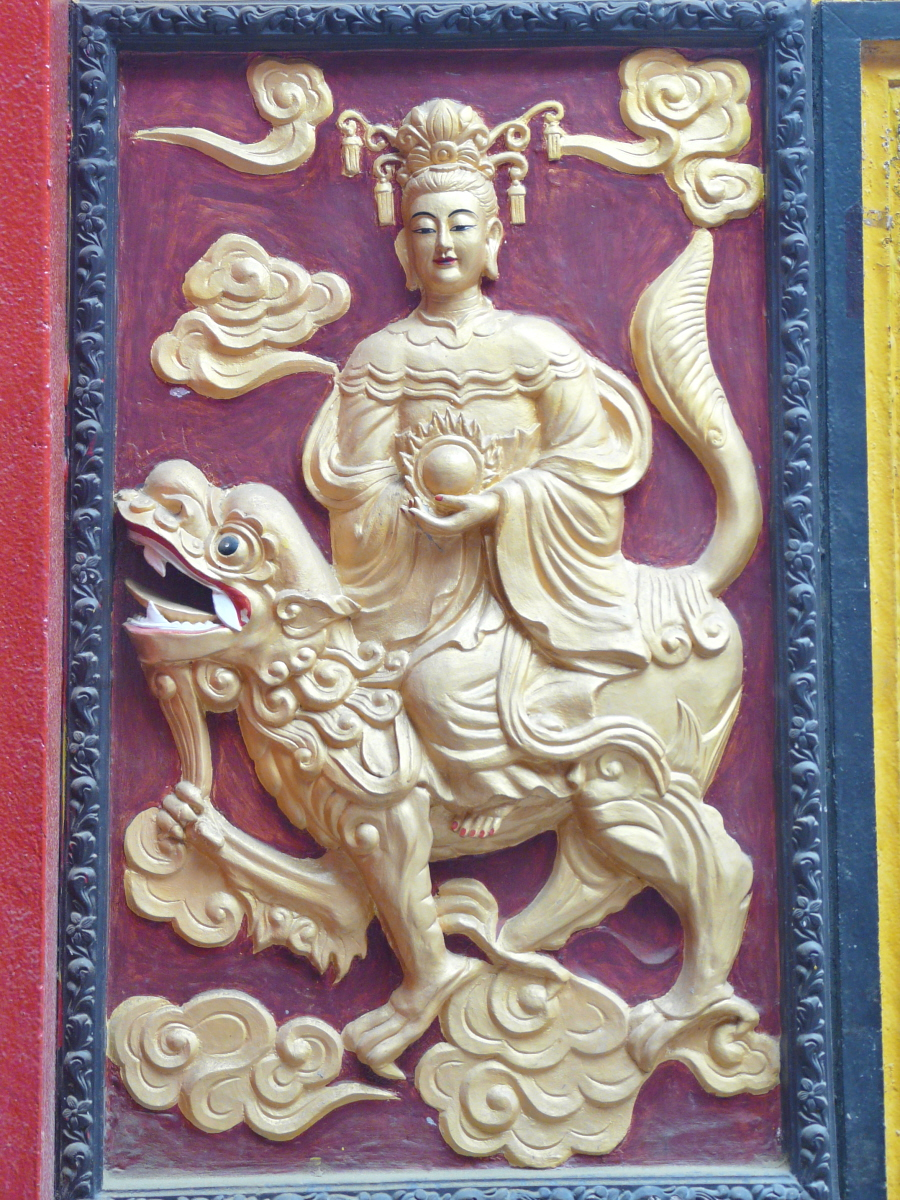
The bodhisattva Manjusri, in female form, is mounted on a lion.

- Manjusri Bodhisattva (Van Thu Bo Tat), the bodhisattva of wisdom, takes a feminine form and sits on a snarling lion. She does not carry her normal attributes, the sword (representing the intellect capable of cutting through error) and the book of wisdom. Instead, her left hand cradles a flaming orb, while her right hand is hidden from view. The lion represents the wild mind subdued by wisdom and meditation.
- Mahasthamaprapta Bodhisattva (The Chi Bo Tat) takes a feminine form as she sits serenely on the back of a lion. Her right hand rests in her lap cradling an orb, while her left hand is raised in a gesture of instruction.
- Samantabhadra Bodhisattva (Pho Hien Bo Tat), the bodhisattva of virtue and religious devotion, takes a feminine form and rides on the back of an elephant. Her right hand cradles a lotus blossom, while the left is raised in a gesture of instruction. The white elephant represents the purification of the senses.

At the center of the altar to the Jade Emperor stands a dark statue clothed in yellow robes and a golden crown, representing the lord of the universe. Just in front is a statue of the chubby "Laughing Buddha" Maitreya (Di Lac)—the Buddha of the future. Maitreya is sitting comfortably on the ground with one knee raised, his robe opened at the chest, his mouth opened in friendly mirth.

=== Main Hallway and Altar to Mazu ===
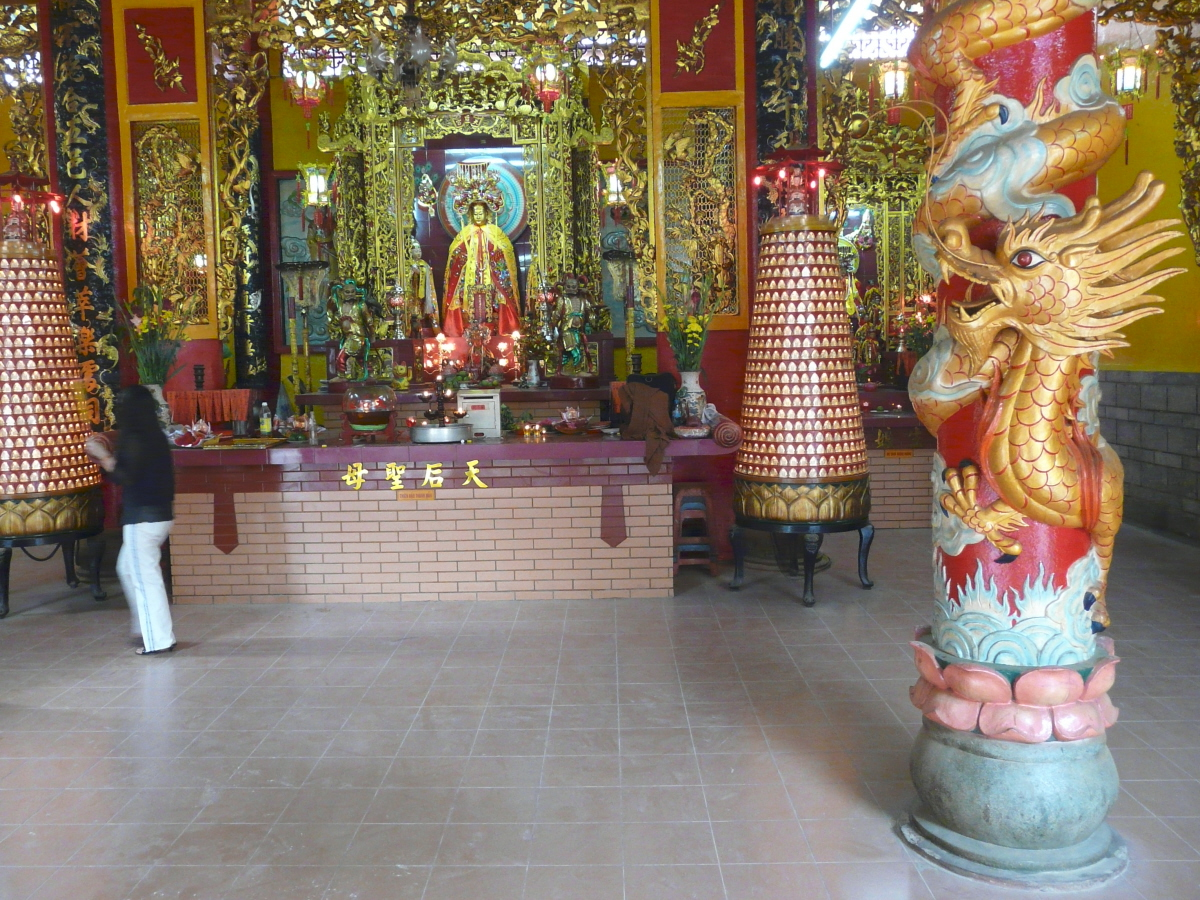
A dragon coils down a pillar in front of the altar dedicated to Mazu.

The main altar inside the pagoda is dedicated to Mazu. Her Vietnamese name Thien Hau is a transcription of her Chinese epithet Tianhou, meaning "Empress of Heaven". She is also known as A Pho, a calque of her Cantonese epithet A-ma, meaning "Beloved Mother". Both roles cause her to be syncretized with both the Virgin Mary and Guanyin. In the center, Mazu stands tall dressed in multicolored robes and crown, her golden face serene and dispassionate. The lady is flanked by much shorter attendants, and scowling demons stand guard in front of her. The space in front of the altar is dominated by pillars decorated with relief carvings of coiled yellow dragons. The dragons spiral downwards along the pillars, from heaven above to the ocean below. Off to one side stands a large cast bronze bell.

On the walls to the left and right of the altar are relief carvings depicting Taoist motifs. On the one side, a group of Taoist Immortals fraternize in a mountainous landscape. Two of them are playing a board game; one is making music. On the other side, a group of celestial women accompany a youth riding a cloud between mountain tops.

=== Outer Courtyard and Altar to Guanyin ===
Beyond the altar to Mazu is the partially covered outer courtyard. In its center is the altar to Guanyin (Quan Âm). Numerous statues and altars to other deities and holy persons are located along the periphery of the courtyard. Incense stick holders, offerings of fruit and rice, and ovens for burning offerings of money, are also present.

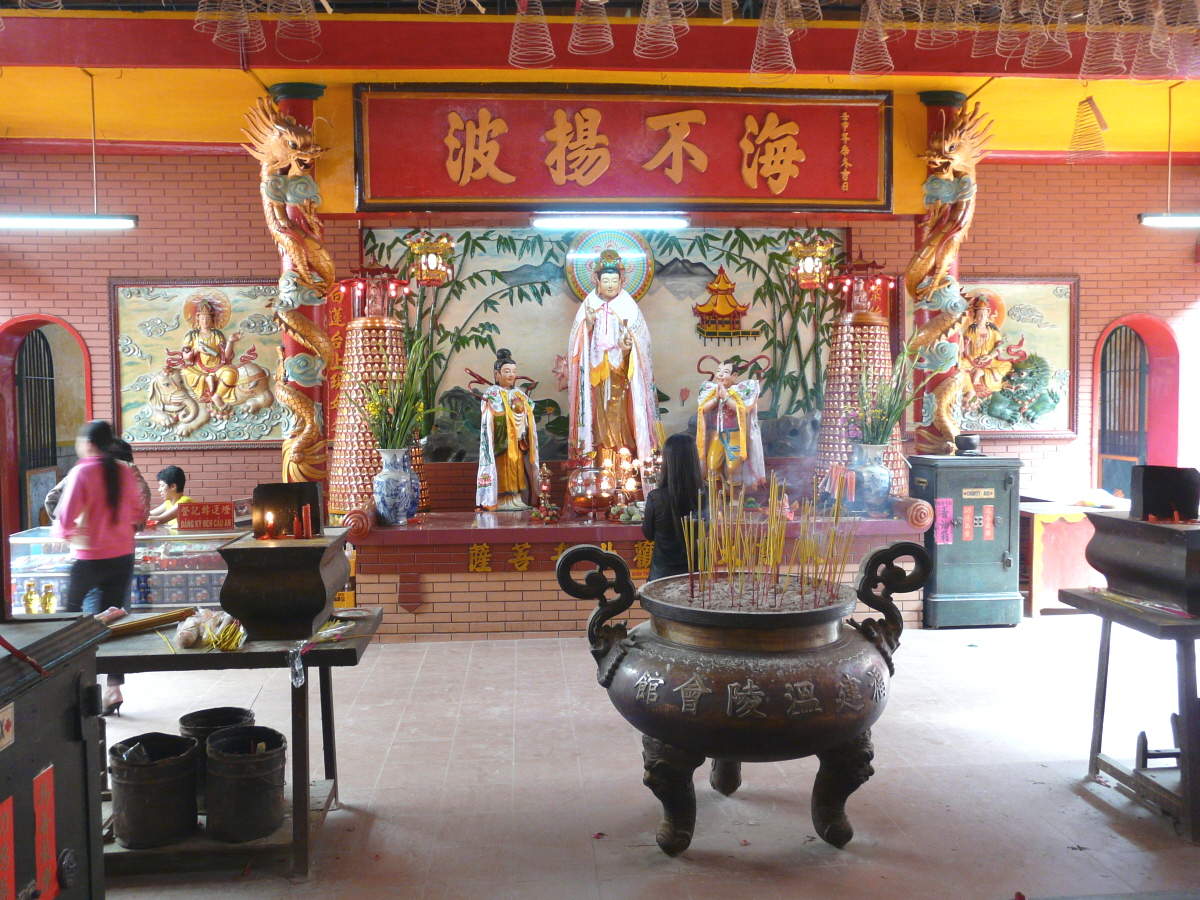
The main image in the outer courtyard is the statue of Guanyin.

The central image is a Chinese-style statue of Guanyin. She is standing tall and smiling, with her right hand raised in gesture of instruction and her left hand cradling the small vase that contains the elixir of life. She is flanked by two smaller figures, one of whom clasps his hands together and gazes at her adoringly. To the left and right of the central group of statues dragons wind upward into the sky around tall pillars. Outside the pillars are a pair of relief images of smiling bodhisattvas mounted on complacent beasts. To one side is a depiction of a female Manjusri seated on the back of a green lion and cradling a lotus stem and blossom. The lion represents the wild mind conquered by the wisdom of the bodhisattva. To the other side is a depiction of a female Samantabhadra on the back of a white elephant and carrying a scroll. The elephant represents the discipline of the senses.

The smaller altars along the periphery of the outer courtyard are dedicated to various figures of Buddhism, Taoism, and Chinese mythology, legends and literature. They include the following:

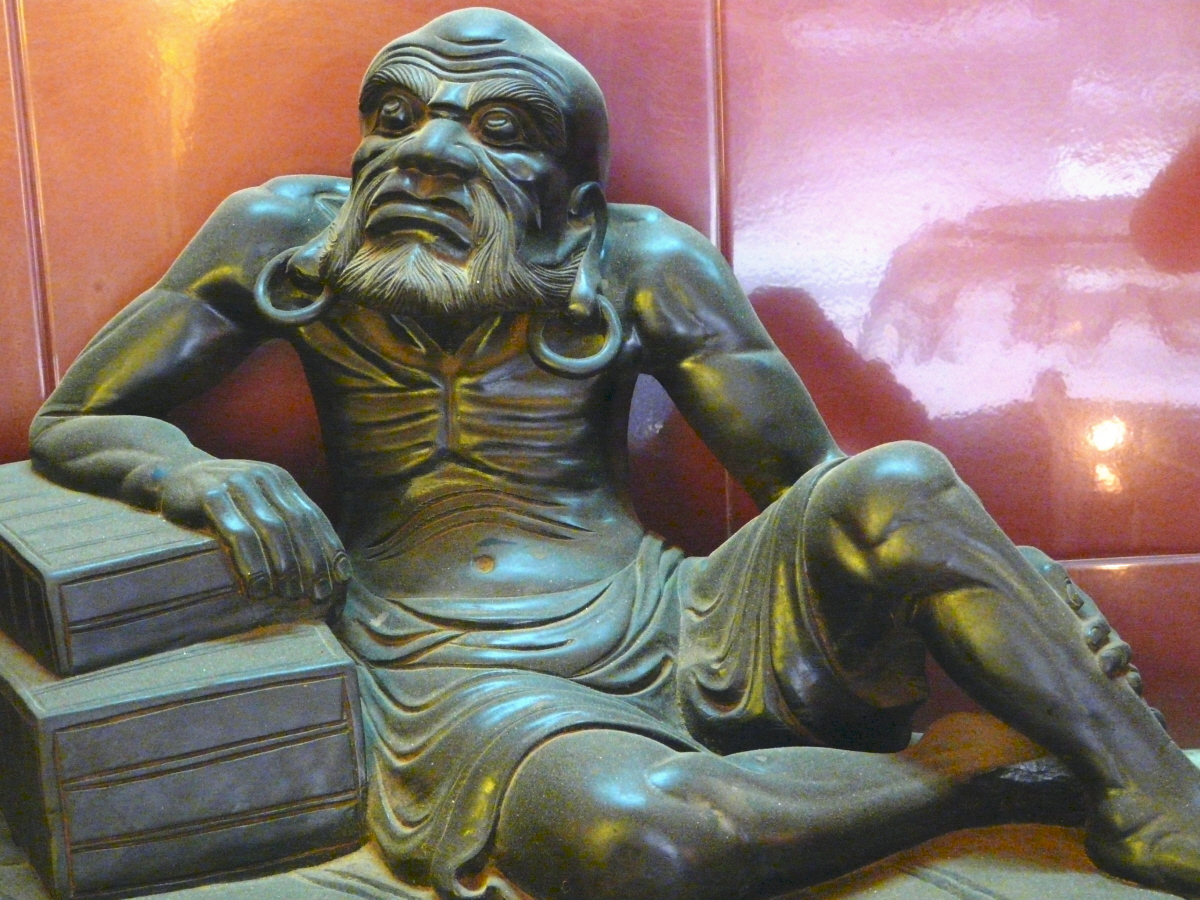
This figure is one of a series representing Buddhist holy men.

- One altar is flanked by numerous statues of Buddhist arhats (La Han), or holy men, made of dark wood. They are in various positions and attitudes. One is sitting on the ground, holding a round bowl in his lap. Another is mounted on an elephant. Another holds his bowl up, as in an offering. And so on.
- Monkey, the central figure in Chinese classic Journey to the West, is depicted in a statue. He is clothed in yellow robes and wears a gilded headpiece. His right hand is raised to his forehead as if he were shielding his eyes from the sun in order to gaze into the distance. Across the courtyard, a small diorama depicts Monkey and his companions Tang Sanzang, Pigsy, and Sandy moving through a rocky landscape, while Guanyin watches over them from the top of a cliff.

== See also ==
- Qianliyan & Shunfeng'er
- List of Mazu temples around the world
- Thien Hau Temple (Cholon)
