= Economy of Vietnam =

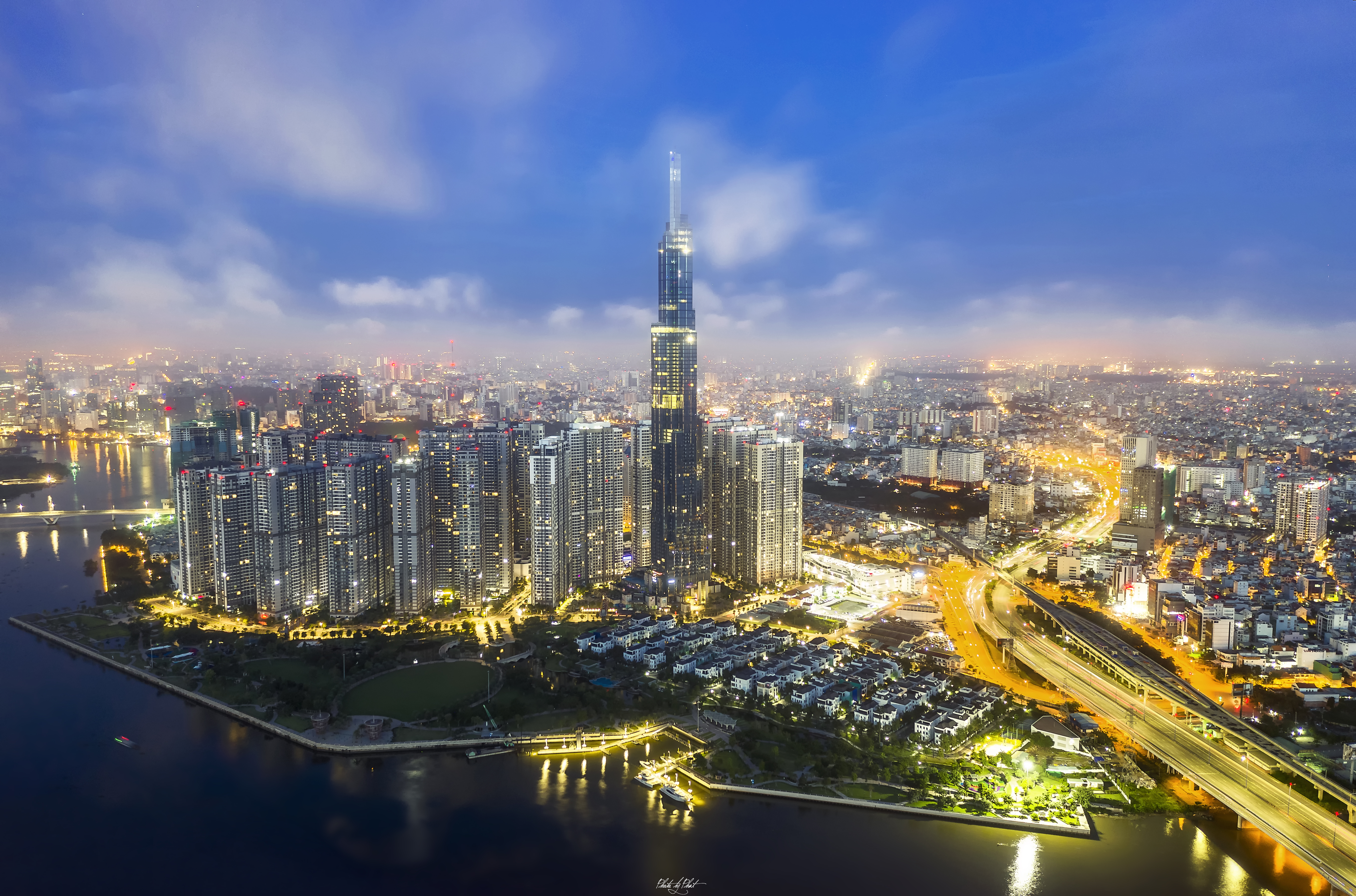
- Ho Chi Minh City, the economic capital of Vietnam
- Currency: Vietnamese đồng (VND; ₫)
- Fiscal year: Calendar year
- Trade organisations: AFTA, WTO, APEC, ASEAN, RCEP, CPTPP, FAO
- Country group: Developing/Emerging; Upper-middle income country; Socialist-oriented market economy

Statistics
- Population: ▲102,300,000 (2025)
- GDP: ▲$542.13 billion (nominal; 2026); ▲$2.06 trillion (PPP; 2026)
- GDP rank: 34th (nominal; 2026); 22nd (PPP; 2026)
- GDP growth: ▲8.4% (2026); ▲7.5% (2027f); ▲5.9% (2028f)
- GDP per capita: ▲$5,260 (nominal; 2026); ▲$19,974 (PPP; 2026)
- GDP per capita rank: 117th (nominal; 2026); 101st (PPP; 2026)
- GDP by sector: Agriculture: 11%; Industry: 38.1%; Services: 42.5%; (2023 est.)
- Inflation (CPI): ▼3.31% (2025)
- Gini coefficient: 36.1 medium (2022)
- Human Development Index: ▲0.766 high (2023) (93rd); ▲0.641 medium IHDI (75th) (2023)
- Corruption Perceptions Index: ▲41 out of 100 points (2025, 81st rank)
- Labour force: 57,041,323 (2025); 71.3% employment rate (2024)
- Labour force by occupation: Agriculture: 27.5%; Industry: 33.4%; Services: 39%; (2022)
- Unemployment: 1.5% (2025); 6.9% youth unemployment (15 to 24 year-olds; 2019)
- Average gross salary: ₫ 7,600,000 / $300 monthly (Q1 2024)
- Main industries: Electronics, machinery, steel, food processing, wood industry, textile, footwear, vehicle, rice, coffee, cashews, seafood, vegetable and tourism

External
- Exports: $475.04 billion (2025)
- Export goods: Electronics, textiles products, machinery, footwear products, transportation products, wooden products, seafood products, steel, crude oil, pepper, rice and coffee
- Main export partners: United States 29.5%; China 18.2%; Hong Kong 3.1%; European Union 13.7%; ASEAN 9.1%; South Korea 6.3%; Japan 6.1% (2024)
- Imports: $455.01 billion (2025)
- Import goods: Machinery and industrial equipment, electronics, petroleum products, raw materials for the clothing and shoe industries, plastics, automobiles, metal, and chemical products
- Main import partners: China 37.8%; South Korea 14.7%; ASEAN 12.4%; Taiwan 6.0%; Japan 5.7%; European Union 4.4% (2024)
- FDI stock: $129.5 billion (31 December 2017 est.); Abroad: $19.75 billion (31 December 2015 est.)
- Current account: ▼$5.401 billion (2017 est.)
- Gross external debt: $96.58 billion (31 December 2017 est.)

Public finance
- Government debt: 37% of GDP (2023 est.) (Note: official data; data cover general government debt and include debt instruments issued (or owned) by government entities other than the treasury; the data include treasury debt held by foreign entities; the data include debt issued by subnational entities, as well as intragovernmental debt; intragovernmental debt consists of treasury borrowings from surpluses in the social funds, such as for retirement, medical care, and unemployment; debt instruments for the social funds are not sold at public auctions)
- Foreign reserves: $86.4 billion (Feb 2023 est.)
- Budget balance: −6.7% (of GDP) (2017 est.)
- Revenue: 54.59 billion (2017 est.)
- Spending: 69.37 billion (2017 est.)
- Economic aid: $2.174 billion (2016)
- Credit rating: Standard & Poor's: BB+ (domestic); BB+ (foreign); BB+ (T&C assessment); Outlook: stable Moody's: Ba2; Outlook: Stable; Fitch: BB+ Outlook: stable
- All values, unless otherwise stated, are in US dollars.

GDP per capita development in Vietnam

The economy of Vietnam is a developing mixed socialist-oriented market economy. It is the 34th-largest economy in the world by nominal gross domestic product (GDP) and the 22nd-largest economy in the world by purchasing power parity (PPP). It is an upper-middle income country with rising living standards, specifically in urban areas like Ho Chi Minh City and Hanoi. Vietnam is a member of the Asia-Pacific Economic Cooperation, the Association of Southeast Asian Nations and the World Trade Organization.

Since the mid-1980s, through the Đổi Mới reform period, Vietnam has made a shift from a highly centralized planned economy to a mixed economy. Before, South Vietnam was reliant on U.S. aid, while North Vietnam and reunified Vietnam relied on Soviet aid until the Soviet Union's dissolution.

The economy uses both directive and indicative planning through five-year plans, with support from an open market-based economy. Over that period, the economy has experienced rapid growth. In the 21st century, Vietnam is in a period of being integrated into the global economy. Almost all Vietnamese enterprises are small and medium enterprises (SMEs). Vietnam has become a leading agricultural exporter and served as an attractive destination for foreign investment in Southeast Asia.

According to a forecast by PricewaterhouseCoopers in February 2017, Vietnam may be the fastest-growing of the world's economies, with a potential annual GDP growth rate of about 5.1 percent, which would make its economy the 10th-largest in the world by 2050. Vietnam has also been named among the so-called Next Eleven and CIVETS countries.

== History ==
=== Before 1858 ===
Civilization in Vietnam had been built on agriculture. The feudal dynasties always considered agriculture as the main economic base, and their economic thoughts have been predicated on physiocracy. Land ownership was regulated, and such large-scale works as dykes were constructed in the Red River Delta to facilitate wet rice cultivation. In peaceful times, soldiers were sent home to do farm work. Furthermore, the court prohibited slaughtering water buffalo and cattle and held many agriculture-related ceremonies. Handicrafts and art were valued, but commerce was deprecated, and businessmen were called by the derogatory term con buôn. Thang Long (Hanoi) was the main handicraft manufacturing center of the country. Chinese noted that the Vietnamese were doing business just like the same with in the Chinese Song dynasty. From the 9th to 13th century, the Vietnamese traded ceramics and silks with regional powers such as China, Champa, Western Xia, Java among others. Further archeological evidence suggests that Muslim traders had lived in Hanoi from around the 9th to 10th centuries, based on Muslim ceramics found in the Old Quarter of Hanoi.

However, from the 16th century, Confucianism was losing its influence on Vietnamese society and a monetary pre-capitalism economy began to develop. During the Lê–Mạc period, the state encouraged semi-industrial business and sea-traders, as the Vietnamese economy would mainly depended on them for the next 250 years. Cities such as Dong Kinh, Hội An and others grew quickly under rapid urbanization. They were later constrained when foreign nations saw them as an economic threat.

During the 17th century, Vietnam's economy had reached its peak as the country was the third-largest economic power in East Asia and Southeast Asia. In the late 18th century, the economy suffered depression because of a series of diseases and disaster such as the Tay Son peasant rebellion which devastated the country. In 1806, Emperor Gia Long of the new Nguyễn dynasty imposed the "Sea Ban policy", which banned all Vietnamese overseas business and stopped Western merchants from entering Vietnam. This policy led to stagnation of the Vietnamese economy in the early-19th century, and contributed to Vietnam becoming a French colony.

=== 1858–1975 ===
Until the French colonization in the mid-19th century, Vietnam's economy had been mostly agrarian, subsistence-based and village-oriented. French colonizers, however, deliberately developed the regions differently as the French needed raw materials and a market for French manufactured goods, designating the South for agricultural production as it was better suited for agriculture, and the North for manufacturing as it was naturally wealthy in mineral resources. Though the plan exaggerated regional divisions, the development of exports—coal from the North, rice from the South—and the importation of French manufactured goods stimulated domestic commerce.

The separation distorted the basic Vietnamese economy by overly stressing regional economic differences. In the South, while irrigated rice remained the principal subsistence crop, the French introduced plantation agriculture with products such as tea, cotton, and tobacco. The colonial government also developed some extractive industries, such as the mining of coal, iron, and nonferrous metals. A shipbuilding industry was begun in Hanoi; railroads, roads, power stations, and hydraulics works were constructed. In the South, agricultural development concentrated on rice cultivation, and, nationally, rice and rubber were the main items of export. Domestic and foreign trade were centered around the Saigon-Cholon area. Industry in the South consisted mostly of food-processing plants and factories producing consumer goods.

When the North and South were divided politically in 1954, they also adopted different economic ideologies: socialism in the North and capitalism in the South. Destruction caused by the Second Indochina War from 1955 to 1975 seriously strained the economy. The situation was worsened by the country's 1.5 million military and civilian deaths, and the subsequent exodus of 1 million refugees, including tens of thousands of professionals, intellectuals, technicians and skilled workers out of the millions of war refugees.

GDP per capita in Vietnam, 1956–1974 (in US$/year)
Year	1956	1958	1960	1962	1964	1966	1968	1970	1972	1974
Republic of Vietnam	62	88	105	100	118	100	85	81	90	65
Democratic Republic of Vietnam	40	50	51	68	59	60	55	60	60	65

=== 1975–1997 ===
The government's Second Five-Year Plan (1976–1981) aimed for solid high annual growth rates in industrial and agricultural sectors and national income and sought to integrate the North and the South, but the goals were not attained. The economy remained dominated by small-scale production, low labor productivity, material and technological shortfalls, and insufficient food and consumer goods. The more modest goals of the Third Five-Year Plan (1981–85) were a compromise between ideological and pragmatic factions; they emphasized the development of agriculture and industry. Efforts were also made to decentralize planning and improve the managerial skills of government officials.

After reunification in 1975, the economy of Vietnam was plagued by enormous difficulties in production, imbalances in supply and demand, inefficiencies in distribution and circulation, soaring inflation rates, and rising debt problems. Vietnam's gross domestic product ( GDP) in 1984 was valued at US$18.1 billion with a per capita income estimated to be between US$200 and US$300 per year. Reasons for this mediocre economic performance have included severe climatic conditions that afflicted agricultural crops, bureaucratic mismanagement, elimination of private ownership, extinction of entrepreneurial classes in the South, and military occupation of Cambodia (which resulted in a cutoff of much-needed international aid for reconstruction).

From the late 1970s until the early 1990s, Vietnam was a member of the Comecon, and therefore was heavily dependent on trade with the Soviet Union and its allies. Following the dissolution of the Comecon and the loss of its traditional trading partners, Vietnam was forced to liberalize trade, devalue its exchange rate to increase exports, and embark on a policy of economic development. Between 1975 and 1994, the United States imposed a trade embargo on Vietnam, forbidding any trade during the 19-year period.

In 1986, Vietnam launched a political and economic renewal campaign (Đổi Mới) that introduced reforms to facilitate the transition from a centralized economy to a socialist-oriented market economy. Đổi Mới combined government planning with free-market incentives and encouraged the establishment of private businesses and foreign investment, including foreign-owned enterprises. Furthermore, the Vietnam government stressed the necessity to lower birth rates when developing the economic and social rights of the population by implementing a policy that restricted the number of children per household to two, called the two-child policy. By the late 1990s, the success of the business and agricultural reforms ushered in under Đổi Mới was evident. More than 30,000 private businesses had been created, the economy was growing at an annual rate of more than 7%, and poverty was nearly halved.

Since the early 1990s, Vietnam had structurally changed away from agriculture, but without industrialization (service-oriented globalization).

In 1990, the state sector was the key hoped-for site of industrialisation. The state sector transitioned away from the processes of bottom-up commercialisation of the 1980s. This created a supply capacity. The supply capacity allowed Vietnam to avoid negative shock as Soviet aid was removed, and it allowed the economy of Vietnam to grow rapidly in the 1990s. Its growth has averaged about 7% annually since the 1990s, a rate second only to China.

Throughout the 1990s, exports increased by as much as 20% to 30% in some years. In 1999, exports accounted for 40% of GDP, an impressive performance in the midst of the economic crisis that hit other countries in Asia. Vietnam became a member of the World Trade Organization (WTO) in 2007, which freed Vietnam from textile quotas enacted worldwide as part of the Multi Fibre Arrangement (MFA) in 1974. The MFA placed restrictions on the import by industrialized countries of textiles from developing countries. For China and other WTO members, however, textile quotas under the MFA expired at the end of 2004 as agreed in the Uruguay Round of trade negotiations in 1994. A 2019 study found that Vietnam's WTO entry led to substantial gains in productivity for private firms, but had no impact on state-owned enterprises. In the absence of state-owned enterprises, "the overall productivity gains would have been about 40% larger in a counterfactual Vietnamese economy."

=== Development since 1997 ===
Vietnam's economic policy following the 1997 Asian financial crisis has been a cautious one, emphasizing macroeconomic stability rather than growth. While the country shifted toward a more market-oriented economy, the Vietnamese government still continues to hold a tight rein over major state sectors, such as the banking system, state-owned enterprises and foreign trade. GDP growth fell to 6% in 1998 and 5% in 1999. The economy saw continuous real GDP growth of at least 5% since 2000.

The signing of the Bilateral Trade Agreement (BTA) between the United States and Vietnam on 13 July 2000, was a significant milestone. The BTA provided for "normal trade relations" status of Vietnamese goods in the U.S. market. It was expected that access to the U.S. market would allow Vietnam to hasten its transformation into a manufacturing-based, export-oriented economy. Furthermore, it would attract foreign investment, not only from the U.S., but also from Europe, Asia and other regions.

In 2001, the ruling Communist Party of Vietnam approved a 10-year economic plan that enhanced the role of the private sector, while reaffirming the primacy of the state. Growth then rose to 6% to 7% between 2000 and 2002 even in the midst of the global recession, making it the world's second fastest-growing economy. At the same time, investment grew threefold and domestic savings quintupled.

In 2003, the private sector accounted for more than one-quarter of all industrial output. However, between 2003 and 2005, Vietnam fell dramatically in the World Economic Forum's global competitiveness report rankings, largely due to negative perceptions of the effectiveness of government institutions. Official corruption is endemic, and Vietnam lags in property rights, efficient regulation of markets, and labor and financial market reforms.

Vietnam had an average GDP growth of 7.1% a year from 2000 to 2004. The GDP growth was 8.4% in 2005, the second-largest in Asia, trailing only China's. The government estimated that GDP grew in 2006 by 8.17%. According to the Minister of Planning and Investment, the government targeted a GDP growth of around 8.5% in 2007.

On 7 November 2006, the General Council at the World Trade Organization (WTO) approved Vietnam's accession package. On 11 January 2007, Vietnam officially became the WTO's 149th member, after 11 years of preparation, including eight years of negotiation. The country's access to the WTO was intended to provide an important boost to the economy, as it ensured that the liberalizing reforms continue and created options for trade expansion. However, the accession also brought serious challenges, requiring the economy to open up to increasing foreign competition.

Vietnam's economy continues to expand at an annual rate in excess of 7%, one of the fastest-growing in the world, but it grew from an extremely low base, as it suffered the crippling effect of the Vietnam War from the 1950s to the 1970s, the punitive embargoes of the United States and its allies, as well as the austerity measures introduced in its aftermath. In 2012, the communist party was forced to apologise about the mismanagement of the economy after a large number of SOEs went bankrupt and inflation rose. The main danger has been over the bad debt in the banks totalling to 15% and forecast growth is 5.2% for 2012 but this is also due to the global economic crisis. The government has launched schemes to reform the economy, such as lifting foreign ownership cap from 49% and partially privatizing the country's state-owned companies that have been responsible for the recent economic downturn. By the end of 2013, the government is expected to privatize 25–50% of SOEs, only maintaining control on public services and military. The recent reforms have created a major boom in the Vietnamese stock market as confidence in the Vietnamese economy is returning.

Vietnam's current economic turmoil has given rise to questions of a possible new period of changing political economy, however poverty remains to be the main concern on the national performance index as of 2018. The Provincial Governance and Public Administration Performance Index (PAPI) found that 28% of survey respondents cited poverty as their main problem. Most respondents agreed with the statement that "[P]overty reduction is imperative to ensuring that Vietnam becomes an advanced, developed country. The percentage of the poorest Vietnamese respondents who believed that their economic situation would worsen increased from 13% in 2016 to 26% in 2017. The percentage of respondents with health insurance increased from 74% in 2016 to 81% in 2017, with strongest gains in the rural population groups.

In 2017, Transparency International, a non-profit that tracks graft ranked Vietnam as 113th worst out of 176 countries and regions for perceptions of corruption. Several graft cases found in 2016 and 2017 led to the corruption crackdown which prosecuted many bankers, businesspeople, and government officials under charges of corruption. PAPI found that bribery at public district hospital services decreased from 17% in 2016 to 9% in 2017. Reports of land seizures went down from an average of about 9% before 2013, to less than 7% in 2017. The number of respondents who believed that their land was sold at a fair market value decreased from 26% in 2014 to 21% in 2017. Land-use graft and petty graft, such as police officers accepting bribes, are common. According to Ralph Jennings, Vietnam has been privatizing many of its state-owned operations to reduce corruption and increase efficiency.

As of March 2018, Vietnam's economy continued to grow, achieving the best annual growth rate in over a decade; which has led media outlets to speculate if in the near future it could be one of the Asian tigers.

According to DBS Bank in 2019, Vietnam's economy has the potential to grow at a pace of about 6.0%–6.5% by 2029. Vietnam can overpower Singapore's economy by the next decade because of its strong foreign investment inflow and productivity growth. However, Vietnam has surpassed Singapore just a year later.

In the early 2020s, despite trade wars with Vietnam's major trade partners, a pandemic and the increasing trend in deglobalisation, Vietnam has still managed to become Asia's top-performing economy. Since 2000, Vietnam has now managed to manufacture higher-value goods with better paying jobs due to its more highly skilled workers. These workers now produce electronics which makes up 38% (in 2020) of Vietnam's exports (compared to 14% in 2010). The country had achieved an average of 6.2% in economic growth (faster than any other country in Asia after China). Foreign investment on the luxury hotels sector and resorts will rise to support the tourist industry.

== Data ==
The following table shows the main economic indicators in 1990–2024. Inflation below 5% is in green.

Year	GDP growth (real)	GDP (in Bil. US$nominal)	GDP (in Bil. US$PPP)	GDP per capita (in US$ nominal)	GDP per capita (in US$ PPP)	Inflation rate (in Percent)	Unemployment rate (in Percent)	Government debt (in % of GDP)
1990	▲5.0	8.2	77.7	121.7	1151.2	▲36.0	12.3	n/a
1991	▲5.8	▲9.7	▲85.0	▲141.1	▲1236.3	▲81.8	▼10.4	n/a
1992	▲8.7	▲12.5	▲94.5	▲179.0	▲1350.3	▲37.7	▲11.0	n/a
1993	▲8.1	▲16.7	▲104.6	▲235.0	▲1468.3	▲8.4	▼10.6	n/a
1994	▲8.8	▲20.7	▲116.2	▲286.0	▲1605.0	▲9.5	▼10.3	n/a
1995	▲9.5	▲26.4	▲130.0	▲358.7	▲1765.7	▲16.9	▼5.8	n/a
1996	▲9.3	▲31.4	▲144.8	▲419.1	▲1934.8	▲5.6	▲5.9	n/a
1997	▲8.2	▲34.1	▲159.3	▲449.3	▲2095.7	▲3.1	▲6.0	n/a
1998	▲5.8	▲34.6	▲170.3	▼448.1	▲2207.3	▲8.1	▲6.9	n/a
1999	▲4.8	▲36.4	▲181.0	▲465.2	▲2310.3	▲4.1	▼6.7	n/a
2000	▲6.8	▲39.6	▲197.6	▲498.6	▲2489.3	▲ -1.8	▼6.4	▲24.8
2001	▲6.9	▲41.3	▲216.0	▲513.2	▲2684.5	▲ -0.3	▼6.3	▲25.4
2002	▲7.1	▲44.6	▲234.9	▲546.6	▲2881.3	▲4.1	▼6.0	▲27.7
2003	▲7.3	▲50.2	▲257.1	▲610.4	▲3124.4	▲3.3	▼5.8	▲29.8
2004	▲7.8	▲62.9	▲284.6	▲757.0	▲3426.5	▲7.9	▼5.6	▼29.4
2005	▲7.5	▲73.2	▲315.7	▲873.1	▲3765.8	▲8.4	▼5.3	▼28.7
2006	▲7.0	▲84.3	▲348.1	▲996.3	▲4114.3	▲7.5	▼4.8	▲30.2
2007	▲7.1	▲98.4	▲383.0	▲1152.3	▲4484.3	▲8.3	▼4.6	▲32.2
2008	▲5.7	▲124.8	▲412.5	▲1446.6	▲4782.9	▲23.1	▼2.4	▼31.0
2009	▲5.4	▲129.0	▲437.5	▲1481.4	▲5023.9	▲6.7	▲2.9	▲36.3
2010	▲6.4	▲143.2	▲471.2	▲1628.0	▲5357.1	▲9.2	2.9	▲36.8
2011	▲6.4	▲171.3	▲511.9	▲1949.8	▲5826.2	▲18.7	▼2.2	▼35.8
2012	▲5.5	▲195.2	▲568.4	▲2197.6	▲6400.2	▲9.1	▼2.0	▲38.3
2013	▲5.6	▲212.7	▲607.0	▲2370.0	▲6762.7	▲6.6	▲2.2	▲41.4
2014	▲6.4	▲232.9	▲660.6	▲2566.9	▲7281.2	▲4.1	▼2.1	▲43.6
2015	▲7.0	▲236.8	▲700.3	▲2581.9	▲7635.3	▲0.6	▲2.3	▲46.1
2016	▲6.7	▲252.1	▲770.9	▲2720.2	▲8316.2	▲2.7	2.3	▲47.5
2017	▲6.9	▲277.1	▲851.1	▲2957.9	▲9085.6	▲3.5	▼2.2	▼46.3
2018	▲7.2	▲303.1	▲934.1	▲3201.7	▲9867.4	▲3.5	2.2	▼43.7
2019	▲7.2	▲331.8	▲1021.3	▲3439.1	▲10584.7	▲2.8	2.2	▼40.8
2020	▲2.9	▲346.3	▲1064.4	▲3548.9	▲10907.8	▲3.2	▲2.5	▲41.1
2021	▲2.6	▲370.1	▲1141.0	▲3756.9	▲11589.3	▲1.8	▲3.2	▼39.0
2022	▲8.0	▲408.0	▲1321.3	▲4101.7	▲13284.2	▲3.2	▼2.3	▼34.6
2023	▲5.1	▲433.7	▲1438.5	▲4324.0	▲14324.4	▲3.3	▼2.0	▼34.0
2024	▲7.1	▲476.4	▲1558.9	▲4622.5	▲15469.9	▲3.7	▲2.1	▲33.5

== Economic sectors ==
=== Agriculture, fishery and forestry ===
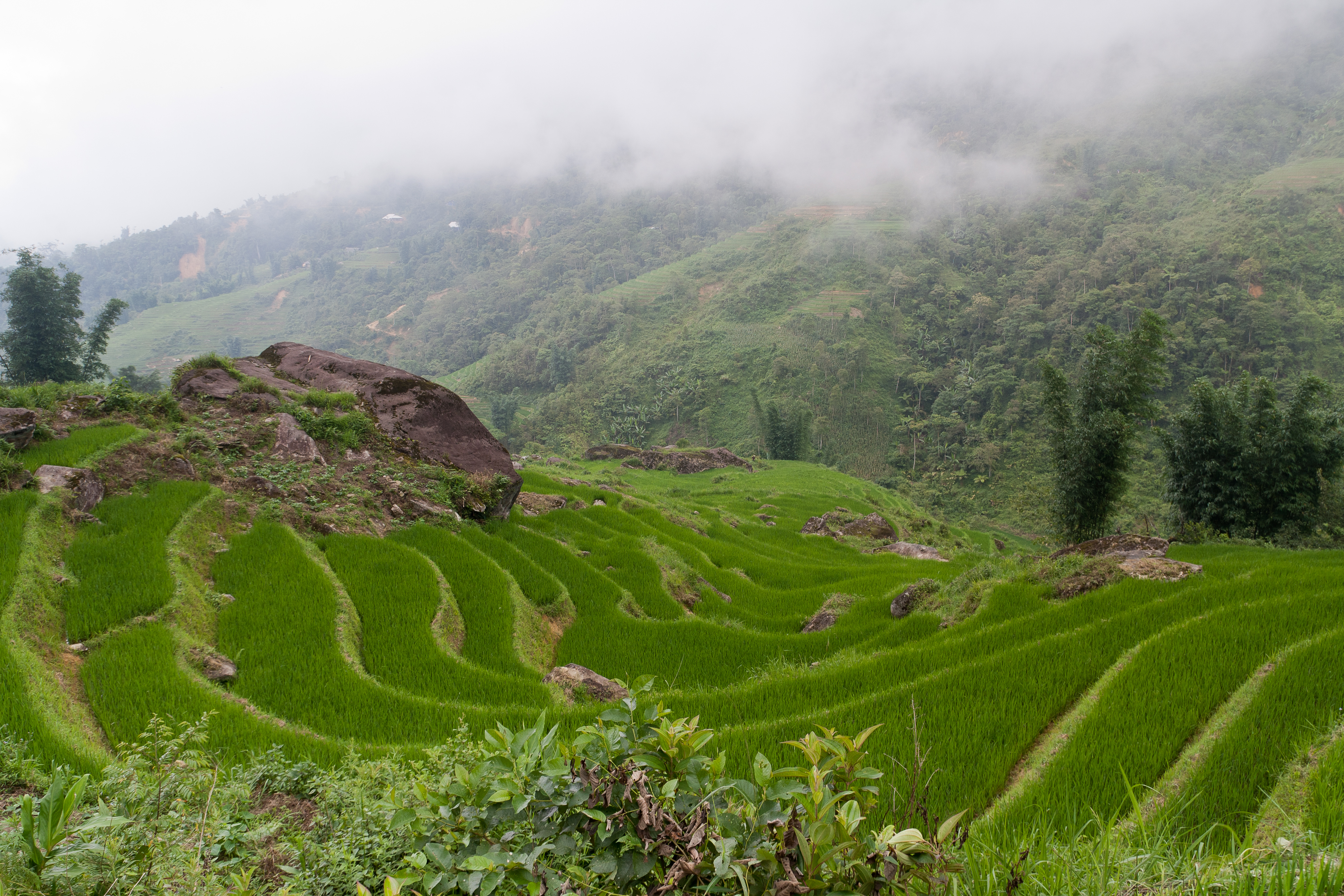
Rice terraces in Sa Pa. Vietnam is the world's third-largest rice exporter.

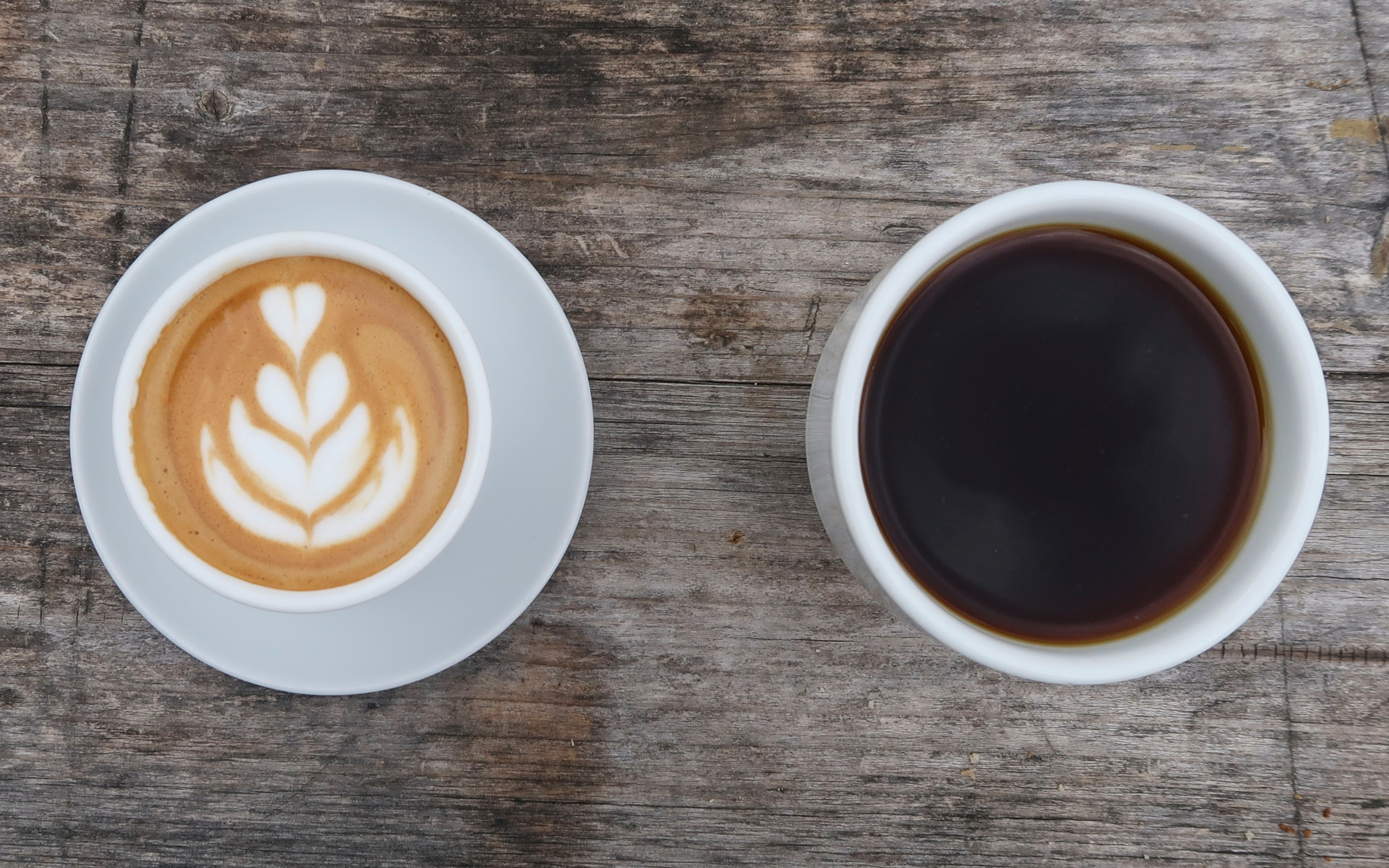
Vietnam is the world's second-largest coffee producer and exporter.

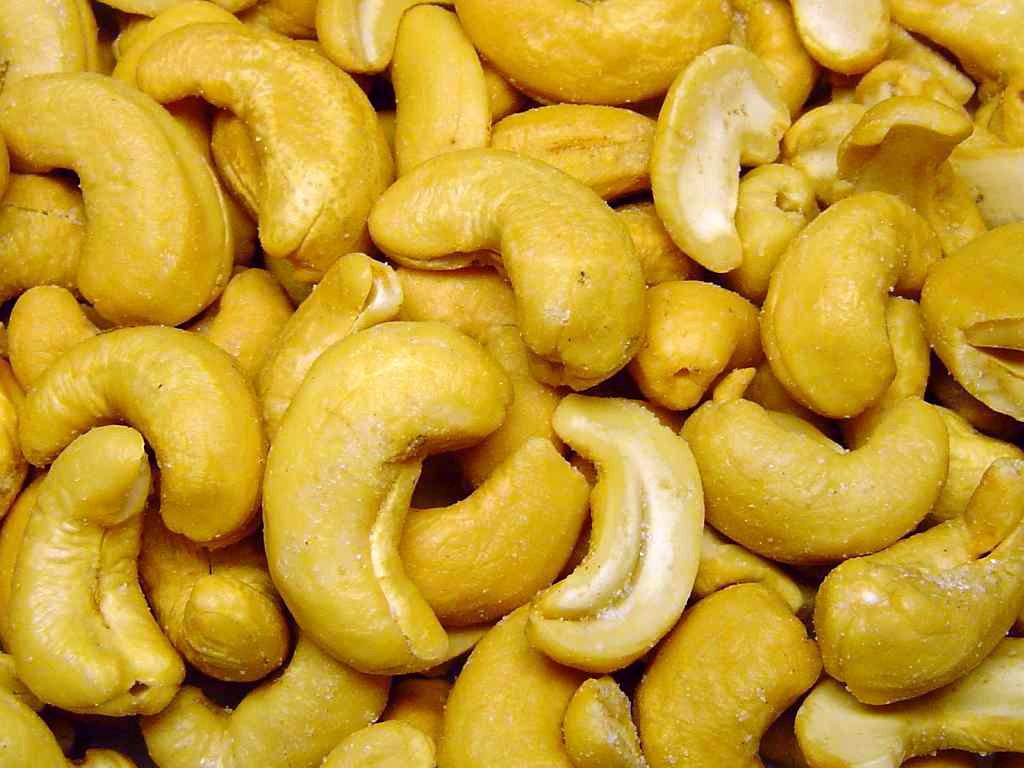
Vietnam is the world's largest cashew exporter.

In 2003, Vietnam produced an estimated 30.7 million cubic meters of wood. Production of sawn wood was a more modest 2,950 cubic meters. In 1992, in response to dwindling forests, Vietnam imposed a ban on the export of logs and raw timber. In 1997, the ban was extended to all timber products except wooden artifacts. During the 1990s, Vietnam began to reclaim land for forests with a tree-planting program.

Vietnam's fishing industry, which has abundant resources given the country's long coastline and extensive network of rivers and lakes, has generally experienced moderate growth. In 2003, the total catch was about 2.6 million tons. However, seafood exports increased fourfold between 1990 and 2002 to more than US$2 billion, driven in part by shrimp farms in the South and "catfish", which are a different species from their American counterparts, but are marketed in the United States under the same name. By selling vast quantities of shrimp and catfish to the U.S., Vietnam triggered antidumping complaints by the U.S., which imposed tariffs in the case of catfish and was considering doing the same for shrimp. In 2005, the seafood industry began to focus on domestic demand to compensate for declining exports.

Vietnam is one of the top rice exporting countries in the world, but the limited sophistication of small-scale Vietnamese farmers causes quality to suffer. Vietnam is also the world's second-largest exporter of coffee, trailing behind Brazil.

Vietnam produced in 2018:

- 44.0 million tons of rice (5th largest producer in the world, behind China, India, Indonesia and Bangladesh);
- 17.9 million tons of sugarcane (16th largest producer in the world);
- 14.8 million tons of vegetable;
- 9.8 million tons of cassava (7th largest producer in the world);
- 4.8 million tonnes of maize;
- 2.6 million tonnes of cashew nut (largest producer in the world);
- 2.0 million tons of banana (20th largest producer in the world);
- 1.6 million tons of coffee (2nd largest producer in the world, only behind Brazil);
- 1.5 million tons of coconut (6th largest producer in the world);
- 1.3 million tons of sweet potato (9th largest producer in the world);
- 1.2 million tons of watermelon;
- 1.1 million tons of natural rubber (3rd largest producer in the world, behind Thailand and Indonesia);
- 852 thousand tons of orange (18th largest producer in the world);
- 779 thousand tons of mango (including mangosteen and guava);
- 654 thousand tons of pineapple (12th largest producer in the world);
- 270 thousand tons of tea (6th largest producer in the world);

In addition to smaller productions of other agricultural products.

In 2018, Vietnam was the world's 5th largest producer of pork (3.8 million tonnes). This year the country also produced 839 thousand tons of chicken meat, 334 thousand tons of beef, 936 million liters of cow's milk, 20 thousand tons of honey, among others.

=== Energy, mining and minerals ===
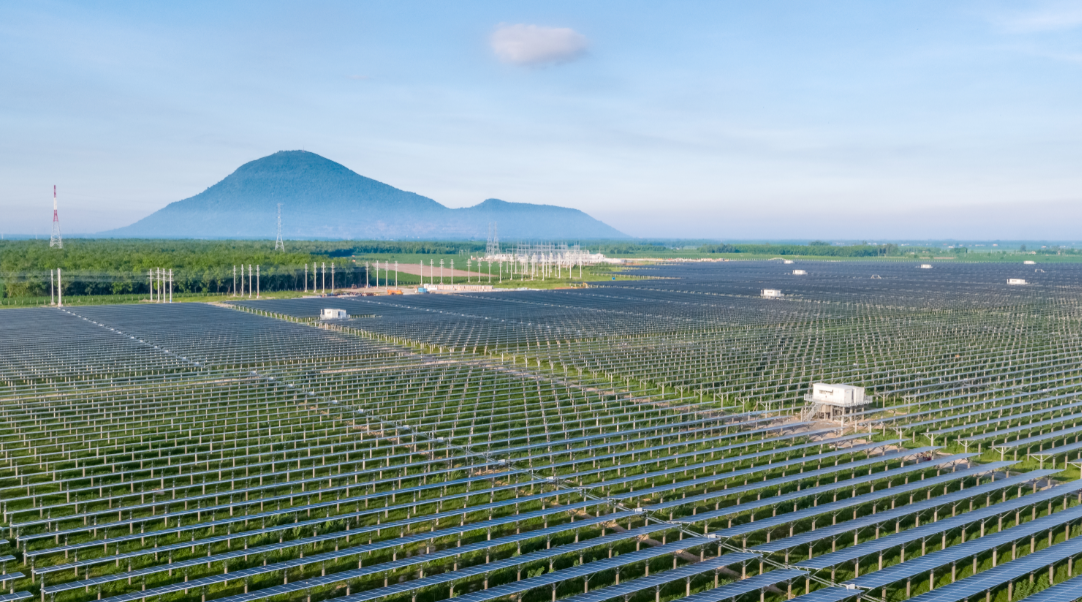
Dau Tieng Solar Power Complex is the largest solar farm in Southeast Asia.

Petroleum is the main source of energy, followed by coal, which contributes about 25% of the country's energy (excluding biomass). Vietnam's oil reserves are in the range of 270–500 million tons. Oil production rose rapidly to 403,300 barrels per day (64,120 m^{3}/d) in 2004, but output is believed to have peaked and is expected to decline gradually.

In 2003, mining and quarrying accounted for 9.4% of GDP, and the sector employed 0.7% of the workforce. Petroleum and coal are the main mineral exports. Also mined are antimony, bauxite, chromium, gold, iron, natural phosphates, tin, and zinc.

In 2019, Vietnam was the 9th largest world producer of antimony; 10th largest producer of tin; 11th largest producer of bauxite; 12th largest world producer of titanium; 13th largest world producer of manganese and 9th largest producer of phosphate in the world. The country is also one of the world's largest producers of ruby, sapphire, topaz and spinel.

Oil was discovered in Vietnam in the mid-1980s and oil production began in the 1990s. Crude oil was Vietnam's leading export until the late 2000s, when high-tech electrical manufactures emerged to become the biggest export market (by 2014, crude oil comprised only 5% of Vietnamese exports, compared to 20% of all exports in 1996). This is in part because Vietnam crude oil peaked in 2004, when crude oil represented 22% of all export earnings. Petroleum exports are in the form of crude petroleum because Vietnam has a very limited refining capacity. Vietnam's only operational refinery, a facility at Cat Hai near Ho Chi Minh City, has a capacity of only 800 barrels per day (130 m^{3}/d). Refined petroleum accounted for 10.2% of total imports in 2002. As of 2012, Vietnam had only one refinery, the Dung Quat refinery, but a second one, the Nghi Son Refinery was planned and was scheduled for construction in May 2013.

Vietnam's anthracite coal reserves are estimated at 3.7 billion tons. Coal production was almost 19 million tons in 2003, compared with 9.6 million tons in 1999. Vietnam's potential natural gas reserves are 1.3 trillion cubic meters. In 2002, Vietnam brought ashore 2.26 billion cubic meters of natural gas. Hydroelectric power is another source of energy. In 2004, Vietnam confirmed plans to build a nuclear power plant with Russian assistance, and a second by a Japanese group.

From 2019 onwards, renewable energy deployment in Vietnam accelerated, by far surpassing the other Southeast Asian countries. Most of the newly deployed renewable energy was in the form of solar and wind power plants. By 2023, however, this development had slowed down, mainly due to limited electrical grid capacity and reduced government support.

Energy consumption 1970–2023
1970	1980	1990	2000	2010	2020	2023
Total energy consumption in terawatt-hours (TWh)
91	▼54	▲77	▲214	▲540	▲1,204	▲1,359
Per capita consumption in kilowatt-hours (kWh)
2,162	▼1,022	▲1,153	▲2,711	▲6,180	▲12,462	▲13,744

=== Industry and manufacturing ===
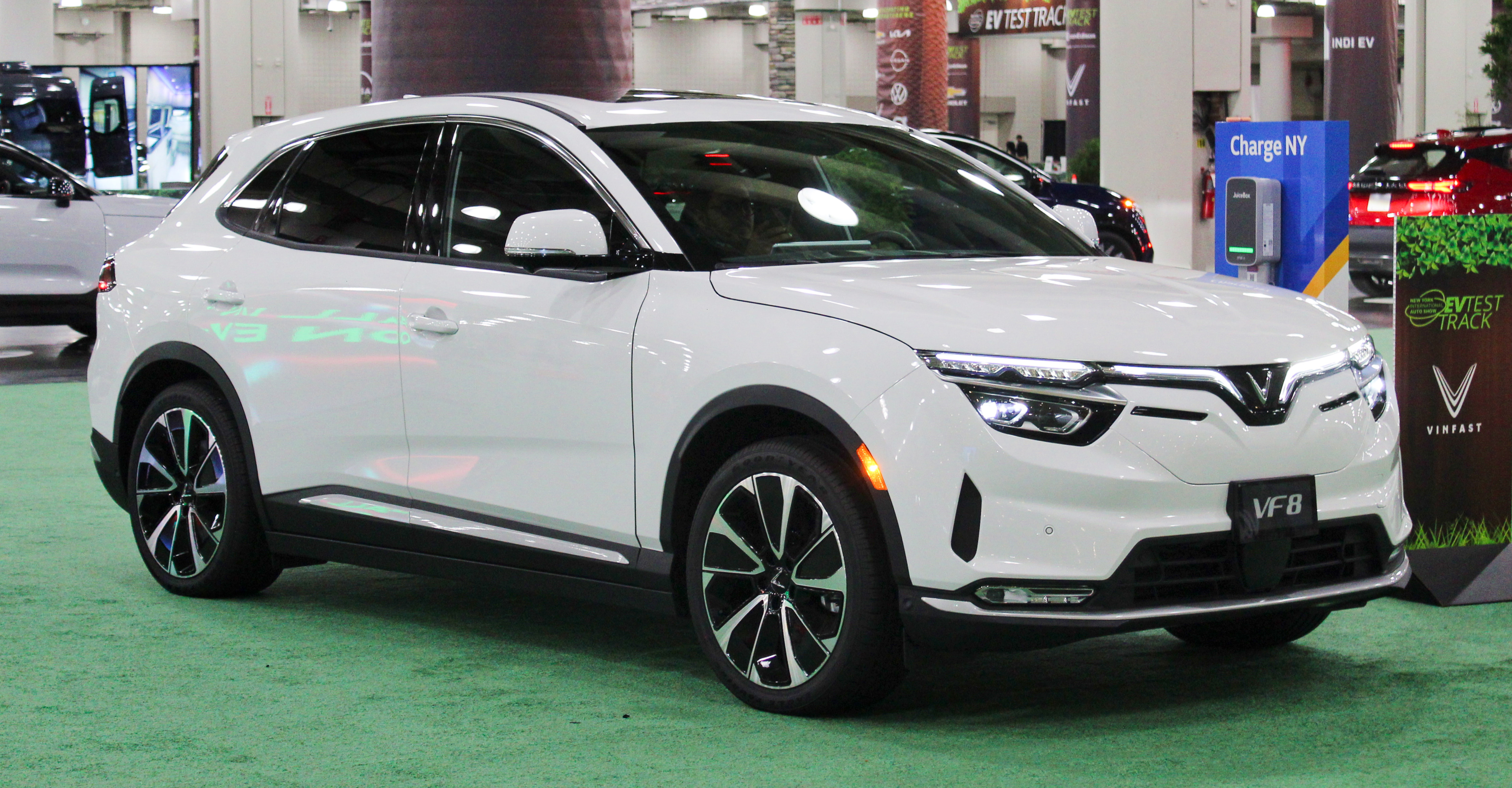
VinFast, Vietnam's first global automaker has its manufacturing facility in Hải Phòng.

Although the industrial sector contributed 40.1% of GDP in 2004, it employed only 12.9% of the workforce. In 2000, 22.4% of industrial production was attributable to non-state activities. From 1994 to 2004, the industrial sector grew at an average annual rate of 10.3%. Manufacturing contributed 20.3% of GDP in 2004, while employing 10.2% of the workforce.

From 1994 to 2004, manufacturing GDP grew at an average annual rate of 11.2%. The top manufacturing sectors — electronics, food processing, cigarettes and tobacco, textiles, chemicals, and footwear goods — experienced rapid growth. Benefits from its proximity to China with lower labor cost, Vietnam is becoming a new manufacturing hub in Asia, especially for Korean and Japanese firms. For instance, Samsung produces about 40% of its phones in Vietnam. Vietnam is also rapidly emerging as a global semiconductor hub.

As of 2019, Samsung employs over 200,000 employees in the Hanoi-area of Vietnam to produce smartphones, while offsourcing some manufacturing to China and manufacturing large portions of its phones in India. LG Electronics moved smartphone production to Vietnam from South Korea, in order to stay competitive. LG said that "Vietnam provides an "abundant labor force", as motivation for the move.

Of note, Samsung accounted for 15 percent of Vietnam's exports in the first seven months of 2024. Although significant, this is a decrease from 2017, during which Samsung accounted for 22.7 percent of Vietnam's exports.

==== Defense ====
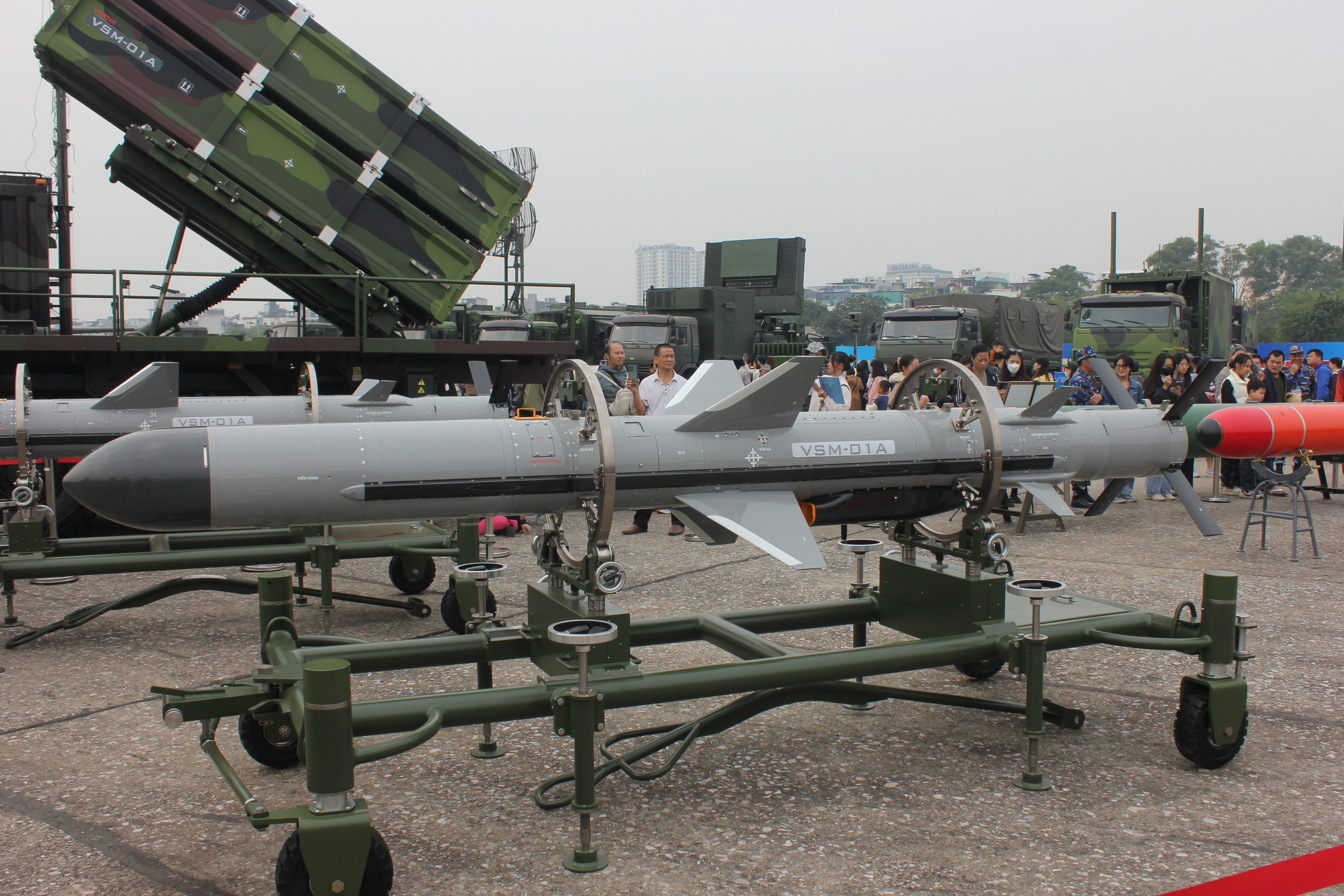
The VSM-01A anti-ship missile being displayed with its VCS-01 missile system, with various Vietnamese indigenous radars being exhibited in the background during the 2024 Vietnam Defence Expo.

The defence industry of Vietnam encompasses the research, development, and manufacturing of military arms and technology by Vietnam's government-affiliated entities. It is largely state-owned and managed by the Ministry of National Defence, mostly led by the General Department of Defence Industry and Viettel, with a focus on achieving self-sufficiency in armaments. Historically, Vietnam has been a major importer of weapons – between 2010 and 2022 it ranked among the top six arms importers in the Asia-Pacific region, relying heavily on Russian-made equipment (about 81.5% of Vietnam's arms imports from 1995 to 2022 came from Russia).

Logo of Vietnam Defence Industry - the government agency tasked with developing, organizing, and managing core national defense industrial bases.

Vietnam has embarked on ambitious programs to build a modern, self-reliant defence industry by 2030, capable of producing advanced weapons for its own armed forces and reducing dependence on foreign suppliers. The government also views the sector as serving dual-use potential for both military and civilian economic benefits, and has signaled the intent to eventually export Vietnamese-made defence products. This drive has been marked by increased investment in domestic R&D, the showcasing locally made weapons at international arms fairs, and high-level policies to integrate Vietnam's defence industry into global supply chains.

=== Service ===
In 2004, services accounted for 38.2% of gross domestic product (GDP). From 1994 to 2004, GDP attributable to the service sector grew at an average annual rate of 6.0%.

==== Banking and finance ====
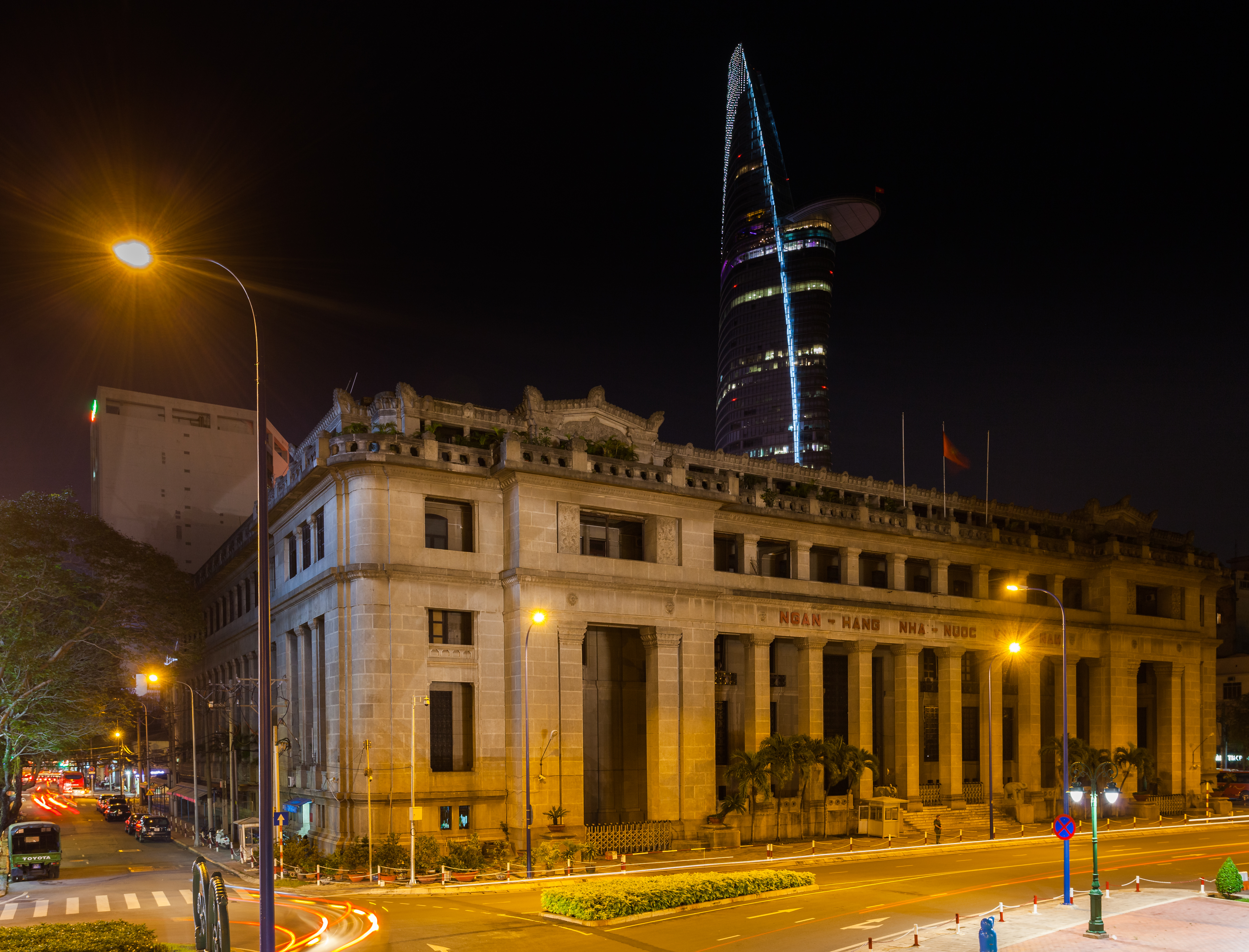
State Bank of Vietnam in Ho Chi Minh City (Saigon)

Ho Chi Minh City Stock Exchange

The most important banks are the state-owned VietinBank, BIDV, and Vietcombank, which dominate the banking sector. There is also a trend of foreign investment into profitable banks. For example, VietinBank is currently owned by Bank of Tokyo Mitsubishi UFJ (19.73%) while Vietcombank is owned by Mizuho (15%).

Vietnam's top five banks by authorised capital
Rank	Bank	Date of update	Authorised capital	
Rank	Bank	Date of update	In VND, billions	In US dollars, billions
1	BIDV	31 December 2020	40,220.2	1.73
2	VietinBank	31 December 2020	37,234.0	1.60
3	Vietcombank	31 December 2020	37,088.8	1.59
4	Techcombank	31 December 2020	35,001.4	1.50
5	Agribank	31 December 2020	30,709.9	1.32

(NOTE: Average exchange rates of 2020. Source: tradingeconomics.com. 1 USD = 23,286 VND)

Vietnam has two stock trading centers, the Ho Chi Minh City Securities Trading Center and the Hanoi Securities Trading Center, which run the Ho Chi Minh Stock Exchange (HOSE) and the Hanoi Stock Exchange (HNX), respectively. However, there is also a third market, the Unlisted Public Companies market (UPCOM) which is a part of the Hanoi Stock Exchange. Together these two trading centres and three exchanges come under the purview of the Vietnam Stock Exchange (VSE). The VSE is a legislated body overseen by the State Securities Commission (SSC) which is a branch of the Ministry of Finance. This structure was established through the Law on Securities 2019.

==== Education ====
Education in Vietnam is a state-run system of public and private education run by the Ministry of Education and Training. It is divided into five levels: preschool, primary school, secondary school, high school, and higher education. Formal education consists of twelve years of basic education, including five years of primary education, four years of secondary education, and three years of high school education. The majority of basic education students are enrolled on a daily basis. The main goals are general knowledge improvement, human resource training, and talent development.

Historically, education in Vietnam followed the Chinese Confucian model, using Chữ Hán (for the Vietnamese language and for Chinese) as the main mode of literature and governance. This system promoted those who were talented enough to be mandarins or royal courtiers in Vietnam and China. This system was then completely overhauled and replaced by a French model system during French colonial times, which has since been replaced and overhauled again during the formation of independent Vietnam and the creation of Chữ Quốc Ngữ alphabet in the 1920s.

Vietnam has attempted to expand its education system. In 2012, estimated national budget for education was 6.3%. In the decade prior, Vietnamese public reception of the country's education system has concerns regarding its inflexible nature and its tests. Citizens have been critical of the curriculum, which has led to social issues including depression, anxiety, and increasing suicide rates. There have been comments from the public that schools should opt for a more flexible studying program, with less emphasis on tests and more focus on developing life skills. In response to public opinion, the Ministry of Education and Training implemented a number of education reforms. Tertiary enrollment rates were 3% in 1995 and then increased to around 30% by 2019.

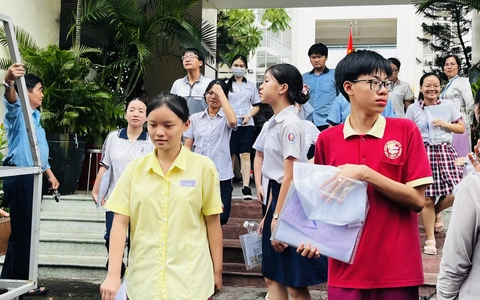
Student in Vietnam

==== Healthcare ====
Development of life expectancy in Vietnam

As an upper-middle income country according to the World Bank, Vietnam is currently striving towards a universal health care system through government-provided social health insurance. In 2024, as implemented under the Law on Health Insurance and as reported by Nguyen The Manh, the director general of the Vietnam Social Security (VSS) agency, about 93.4% of the population had health insurance coverage, with nearly 13,000 public and private health facilities receiving over 174 million visits. The government fully covers the health insurance costs of the poor, ethnic minorities, children under 6, and elderly people over 80.

==== Retail ====
Major supermarkets in Vietnam include nationwide chains like Co.opmart, Big C and Bach Hoa Xanh. International retailers such as Aeon, Lotte Mart and Mega Market (formerly Metro) are also prevalent. Convenience stores are popular, with Circle K found on many streets.

==== Telecommunications ====
Communications in Vietnam include the use of telephones, radio, television and Internet.

==== Transport ====
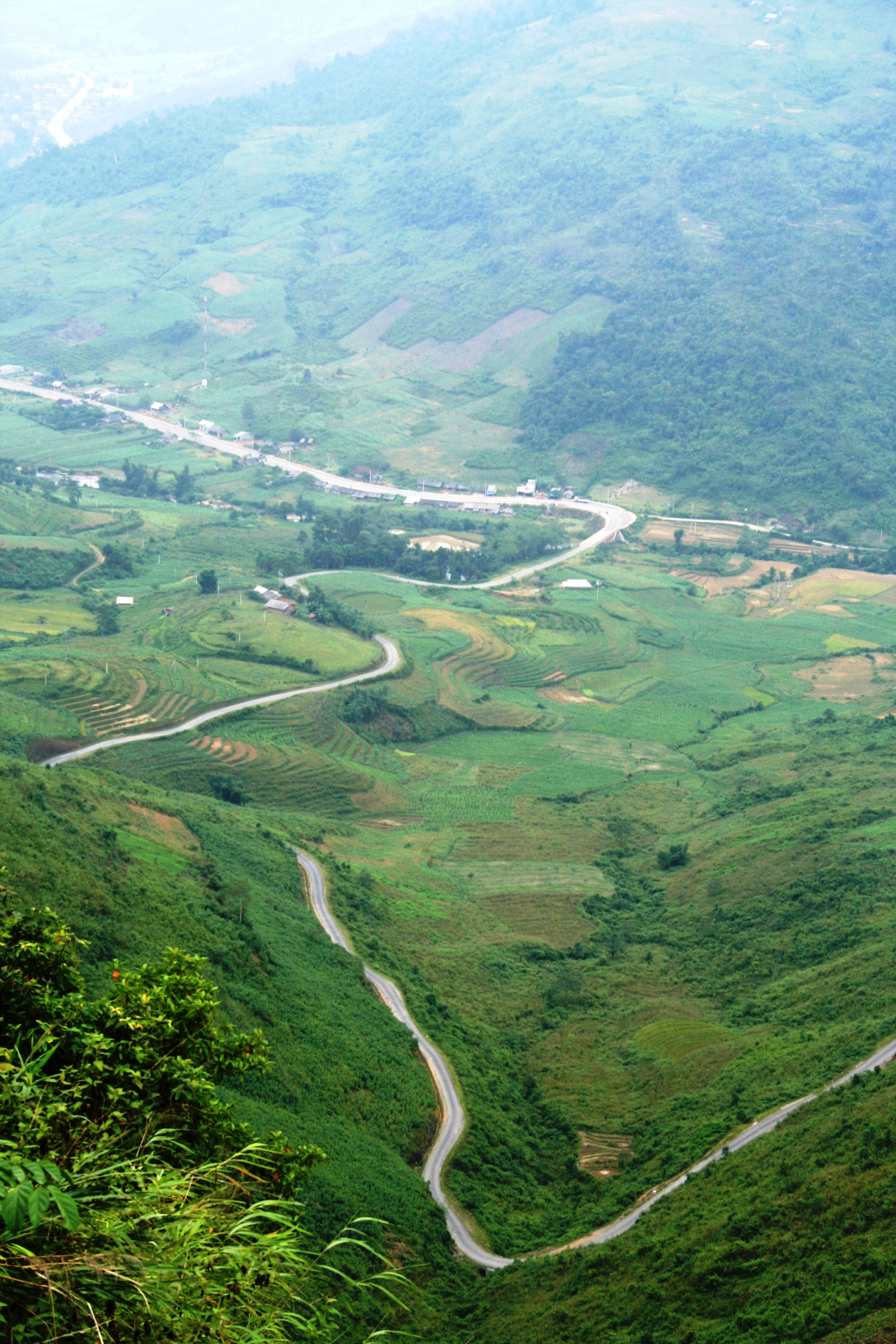
Bắc Sum Pass on National Road 4C

Transportation in Vietnam is improving rapidly in terms of both quantity and quality. Road traffic is growing rapidly but the major roads are dangerous and slow to travel on due to outdated design and an inappropriate traffic mix. In recent years, the construction of expressways has accelerated. Air travel is also important for long-distance travel. The two major metropolises of Hanoi and Ho Chi Minh City operate metro networks which are currently being expanded. Like most of the other ASEAN member states, Vietnam has historically under invested in public transit.

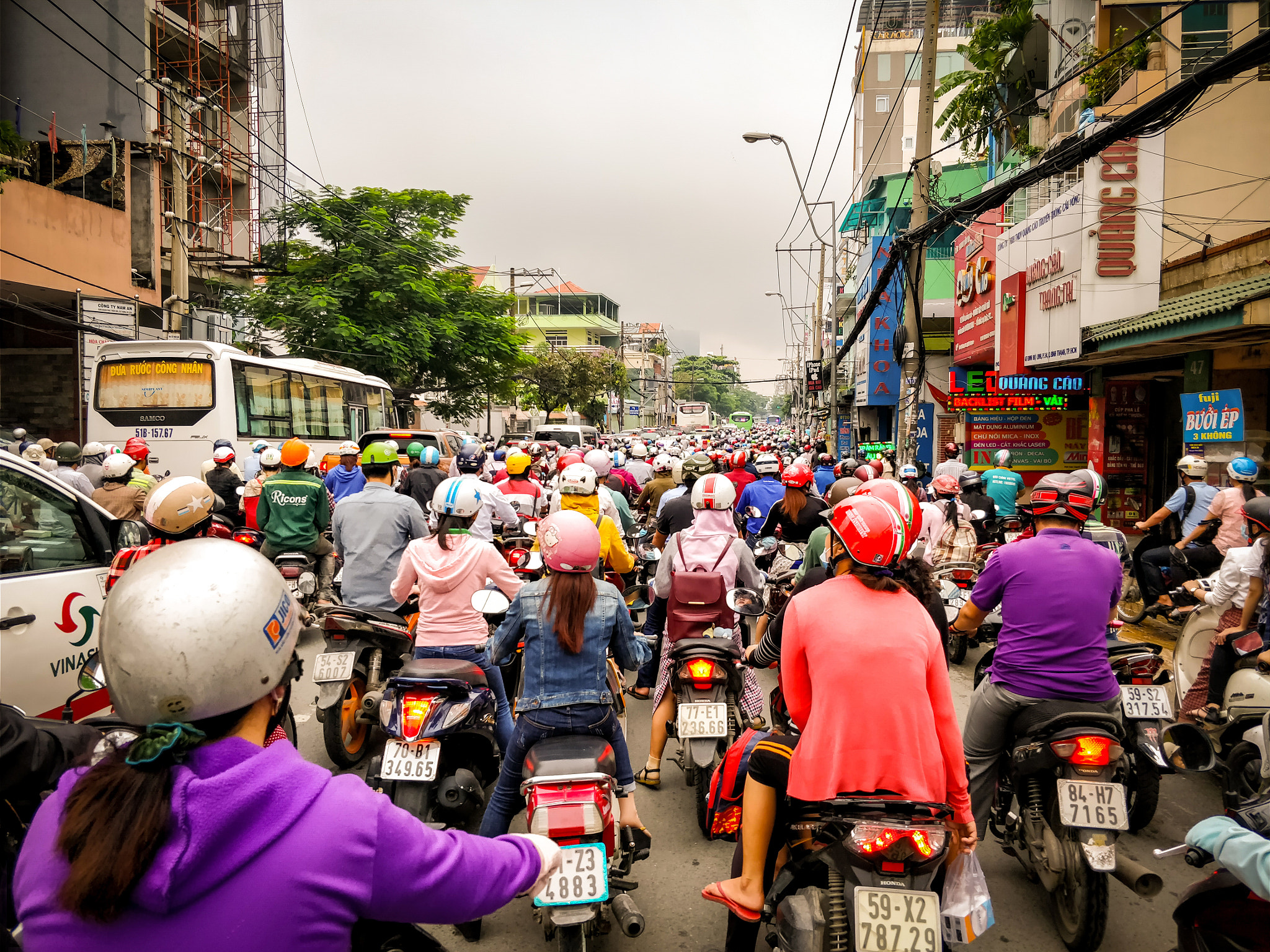
Vietnamese road traffic is dominated by motorcycles. Heavy traffic, bad air and loud noises are expected regularly.

==== Tourism ====
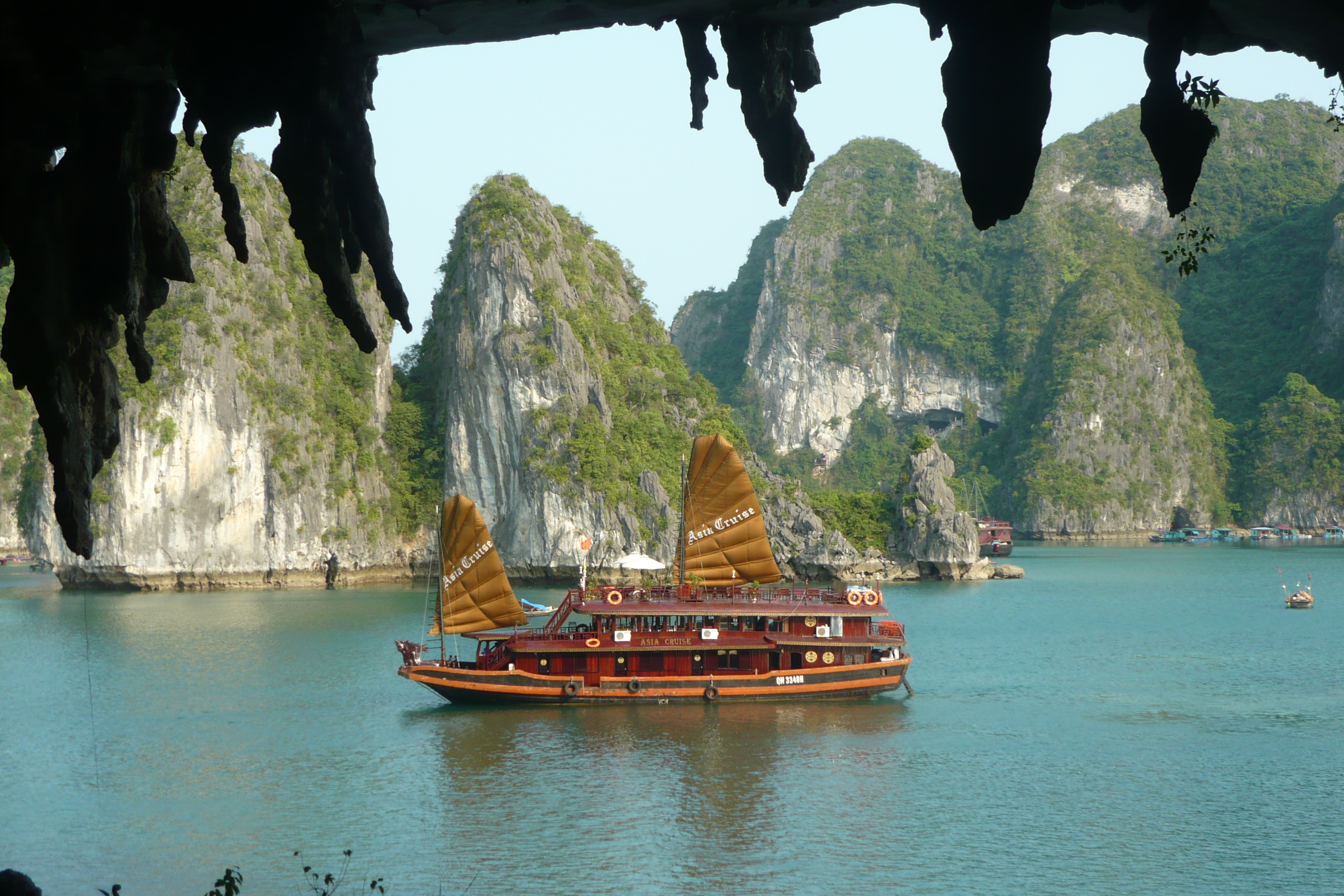
Hạ Long Bay was recognised as a World Heritage Site in 1994.

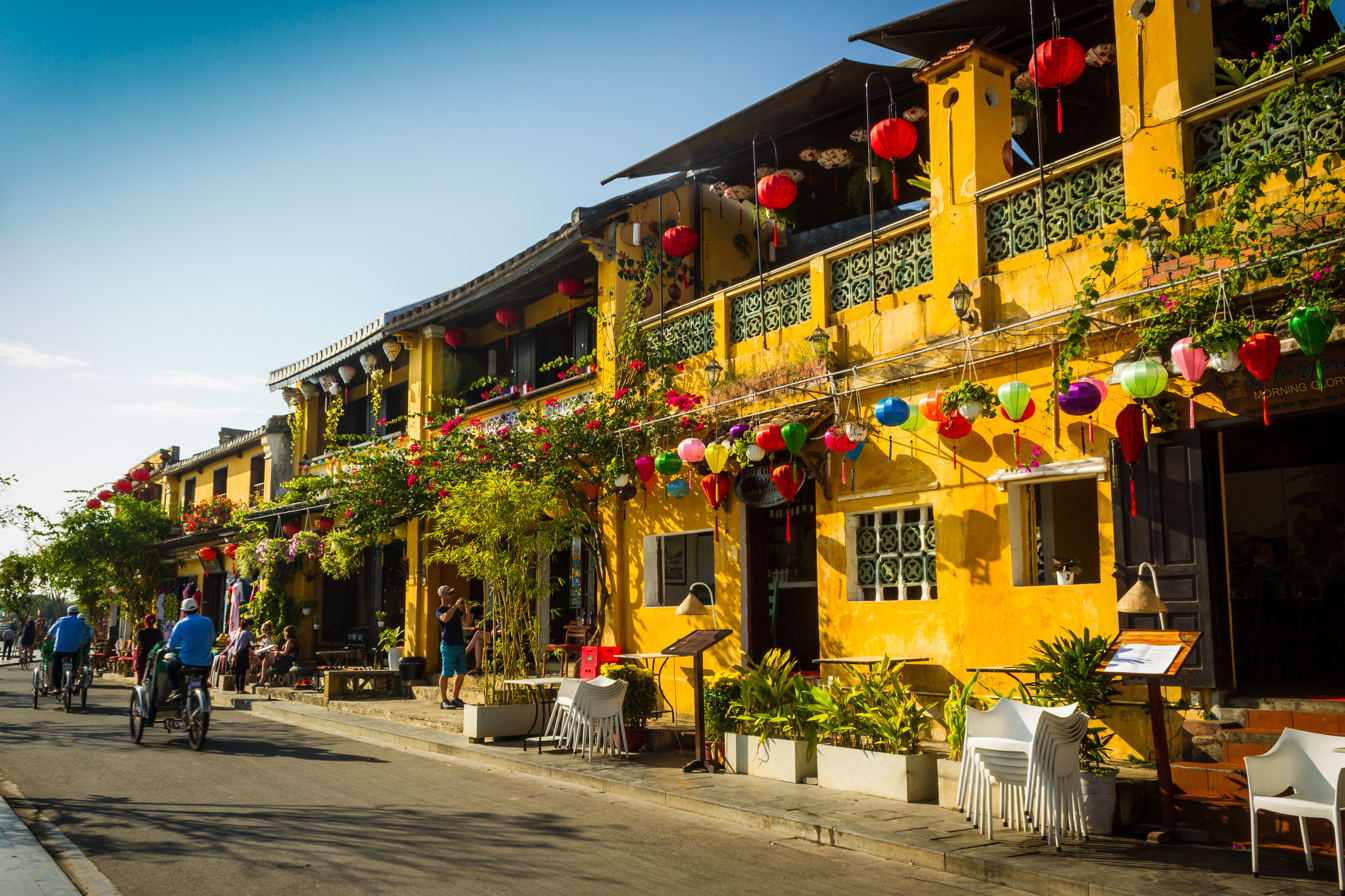
Hội An Ancient Town

In 2012, Vietnam received 6.8 million international visitors and the number was expected to reach over 7 million in 2013. In TripAdvisor's list of top 25 destinations Asia 2013 by travelers' choice, there are four cities of Vietnam, namely Hanoi, Ho Chi Minh City, Hoi An and Ha Long.

2016 was the first year ever which Vietnam received over 10 million international visitors. Since then, this figure has continued to rise. In 2019, Vietnam with 18 million international visitors was fifth most visited country in the Asia-Pacific region as per World Tourism rankings released by the United Nations World Tourism Organization.

During the COVID-19 pandemic in Vietnam, the country suspended issuance of all tourist visas from March 2020 and recorded a 98% year-on-year drop in foreign visitors for April 2020. Furthermore, Total tourism revenues dropped by over 60% year-on-year for July 2020. The country reopened to international arrivals in March 2022.

In the first six months of 2024, Vietnam received 6,943,961 tourist arrivals representing an increase over the same period in 2023 of 65.7 percent.

=== Science and technology ===
The main managing agency responsible for science and technology (S&T) in Vietnam is the Ministry of Science and Technology (MOST). MOST's responsibilities include scientific research, technology development and innovation activities; development of science and technology potentials; intellectual property; standards, metrology and quality control; atomic energy, radiation and nuclear safety; and state management on public services in fields under the Ministry’s management as stipulated by law.

=== Export of labour ===
The export of labour, that is the sending of Vietnamese workers to work in other countries, is also key to the Vietnamese economy, with much of their earnings being sent back to Vietnam. This labour export was disrupted due to the COVID pandemic, however by 2022, Vietnam hopes to send 90,000 workers abroad. Traditional destinations have included South Korea, Japan, Malaysia, Taiwan and now Vietnam is aiming for other countries such as Germany, Russia, and Israel.

=== Water supply and sanitation ===
Water supply and sanitation in Vietnam is characterized by challenges and achievements. Among the achievements is a substantial increase in access to water supply and sanitation between 1990 and 2010, nearly universal metering, and increased investment in wastewater treatment since 2007. Among the challenges are continued widespread water pollution, poor service quality, low access to improved sanitation in rural areas, poor sustainability of rural water systems, insufficient cost recovery for urban sanitation, and the declining availability of foreign grant and soft loan funding as the Vietnamese economy grows and donors shift to loan financing. The government also promotes increased cost recovery through tariff revenues and has created autonomous water utilities at the provincial level, but the policy has had mixed success as tariff levels remain low and some utilities have engaged in activities outside their mandate.

== Currency, exchange rate and inflation ==
Countries or territories by GDP (PPP) per capita in 2022.

=== Currency ===
The currency used in Vietnam is the đồng, shortened as VND or đ.

Countries or territories by GDP (nominal) per capita in 2022.

=== Exchange rate ===
The exchange rate between the U.S. dollar and the Vietnamese đồng is important because the dong, although not freely convertible, is loosely pegged to the dollar through an arrangement known as a "crawling peg". This mechanism allows the dollar–dong exchange rate to adjust gradually to changing market conditions. This was set at 3 percent either side of a fixed rate set each day by the SBV, however, it was increased to 5 percent in October 2022.

As of 27 December 2024, a US dollar is worth 25,448 Vietnamese đồng.

Gold still maintains its position as a physical currency to a certain extent, although it has seen its economic role declining in recent years.

=== Inflation ===
Vietnam saw high inflation in the 1980s. During this period, there was excessive demand for the industrial sector development, food, and other commodities. In order to stimulate supply, government attempted co-integration of parallel and planned market. Though the initial reform in the 1980s raised the total output, due to the report being partial, it also led to the CPI inflation rate being pushed to 200% in 1982. To tackle this, the government introduced forced savings, which can be understood as the accumulation of unspent money to make the monetary overhang.

Vietnam's economy experienced a hyperinflation period in its early years of the extensive reform program, especially from 1987 to 1992.

In 2008, inflation was tracking at 20.3% for the first half of the year, higher than the 3.4% in 2000, but down significantly from 160% in 1988.

In 2010, inflation stood at 11.5%, and 18.58% in 2011.

At the end of 2012, inflation stood at 7.5%, a substantial decrease from 2011.

In 2013, inflation stood at 6%, and 4.09% in 2014. In 2016, it was 2%.

== Mergers and acquisitions ==
With 1,120 inbound deals with a cumulated value of almost $15 billion, there is a demonstrated interest by foreign companies to access the Vietnamese market or continue expansion using mergers and acquisitions. From 1991 to February 2018, Vietnamese companies were involved as either an acquiror or an acquired company in 4,000 mergers and acquisitions with a total value of $40.6 billion. The mergers and acquisitions activities faced many obstacles, lowering the rate of success of the transaction. Common obstacles come from culture, transparency and legal aspects. Among the largest and most prominent transactions since 2000 are:

Date announced	Acquirer name	Acquirer nation	Target name	Target nation	Value of transaction (US$ millions)
19 December 2017	Vietnam Beverage Co. Ltd.	Vietnam	Sabeco	Vietnam	4,838.49
16 February 2012	Perenco SA	France	ConocoPhilips Co-Oil&Gas Asset	Vietnam	1,290.00
29 April 2016	Central Group of Cos	Thailand	Casino Guichard-Perrachon-BigC	Vietnam	1,135.33
25 December 2015	Singha Asia Holding Pte Ltd.	Singapore	Masan Consumer Corp	Vietnam	1,100.00
13 February 2015	China Steel Asia Pac Hldg Pte	Singapore	Formosa Ha Tinh (Cayman) Ltd.	Vietnam	939.00
8 July 2014	Berli Jucker PCL	Thailand	Metro Cash & Carry Vietnam Co	Vietnam	875.20
27 December 2012	Bk of Tokyo-Mitsubishi UFJ Ltd.	Japan	VietinBank	Vietnam	742.34
17 April 2015	TCC Land International Pte Ltd.	Singapore	Metro Cash & Carry Vietnam Co	Vietnam	705.14
10 May 2011	Vincom JSC	Vietnam	Vinpearl JSC	Vietnam	649.39
28 January 2016	Masan Grp Corp	Vietnam	Masan Consumer Corp	Vietnam	600.00

All of the top 10 deals are inbound into Vietnam and none are outbound.

== Trade ==
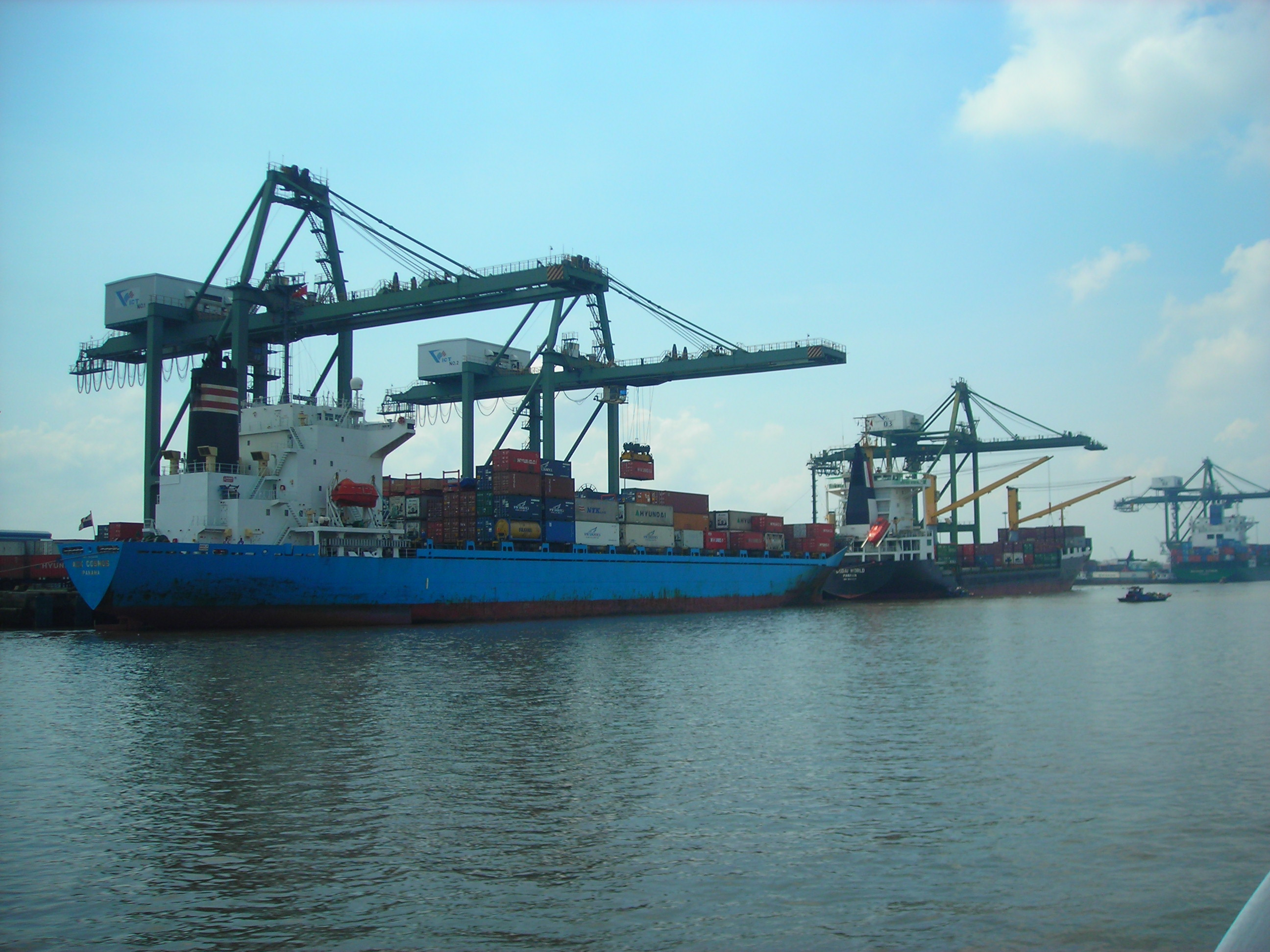
Saigon Port is the busiest container port in Vietnam. It is capable of accommodating post-Panamax ships.

Economic relations with the United States are improving but are not without challenges. Although the United States and Vietnam reached a landmark bilateral agreement in December 2001, which helped increase Vietnam's exports to the United States, disagreements over textile and catfish exports are hindering full implementation of the agreement. Further disrupting the economic relations between the two countries were efforts in Congress to link non-humanitarian aid to Vietnam's human rights record. Barriers to trade and intellectual property are also within the purview of bilateral discussions.

Given neighboring China's rapid economic ascendancy, Vietnam highly values its economic relationship with China. Following the resolution of most territorial disputes, trade with China is growing rapidly, and in 2004, Vietnam imported more products from China than from any other country. In November 2004, the Association of Southeast Asian Nations (ASEAN), of which Vietnam is a member, and China announced plans to establish the world's largest free-trade area by 2010.

Vietnam became a member of the World Trade Organization (WTO) on 11 January 2007.

In December 2015, Vietnam joined the ASEAN Economic Community along with the 9 other ASEAN members. The community's goal is to integrate the 10 members of ASEAN and bring a freer flow of labor, investment and trade to the region.

Currently, Vietnam is being tugged in multiple directions from multiple powers, namely, Russia, China and the U.S. in its attempts to achieve economic multilateralization. Alternatively in the region, it is also pulled by either China, South Korea, Japan or ASEAN countries, as well as other constituents such as Taiwan & Hong Kong as well as Australia/New Zealand and India in the region (ASEAN+3 and ASEAN+6).

=== Foreign trade ===
Since Đổi Mới in 1986, Vietnam has increased trading, growing both exports and imports in double digits ever since. More recently, alarms on trade account deficits have been raised domestically, especially after joining the WTO in 2007. Throughout the next five years after 2007, Vietnam ran a trade deficit with the rest of the world in the tens of billions of dollars, with the record trade deficit in 2008 of US$18 billion.

The account deficit has since decreased. In 2012, Vietnam recorded a trade surplus of $780 million, the first trade surplus since 1993. Total trade reached $228.13 billion, an increase of 12.1% from 2011. In 2013, Vietnam recorded the second year of trade surplus of $863 million. In 2014, Vietnam recorded the third year of trade surplus of $2.14 billion, the largest trade surplus ever in history. Three years later, in 2017, it surpassed itself with a record of $2.92 billion.

Year	Total trade (US$ billions)	Exports		Imports		Account balance US$ billions)
Year	Total trade (US$ billions)	(US$ billions)	Change (%)	(US$ billions)	Change (%)	Account balance US$ billions)
2001	31.20	15.00		16.20		-1.2
2002	36.40	16.70	11.3	19.70	21.6	-3.0
2003	45.20	20.2	21.0	25.2	27.9	-5.1
2004	58.50	26.5	31.2	32.0	27.0	-5.4
2005	69.40	32.4	22.3	37.0	5.7	-4.5
2006	84.70	39.8	22.8	44.9	21.4	-5.1
2007	111.30	48.6	22.1	62.7	39.6	-14.1
2008	143.40	62.7	29.0	80.7	28.7	-18.0
2009	127.00	57.1	-8.9	69.9	-13.4	-12.9
2010	157.00	72.2	26.4	84.8	21.3	-12.6
2011	203.41 doesn't add	96.91	34.2	106.75	25.8	-9.84
2012	228.57 doesn't add	114.57	18.2	113.79	6.6	0.780
2013	263.47	132.17	15.4	131.30	15.4	0.863
2014	298.23	150.19	13.7	148.04	12.1	2.14
2015	327.76	162.11	7.9	165.65	12	-3.54
2016	349.20	175.94	8.6	173.26	4.6	2.68
2017	425.12	214.01	21.2	211.1	20.8	2.92
2018	480.17	243.48	13.2	236.69	11.1	6.8
2019	517.26	264.189	8.4	253.071	6.8	11.12
2020	545.36	282.65	7	262.7	3.7	19.95
2024	786.29	405.53	14.3	380.76	16.7	24.77

==== Exports ====
Exports of Vietnam by product category (2019) Chemical products Transportation Machines Mineral products Plastics and rubbers Metals Foodstuffs Precious metals Textiles Instruments Animal products Vegetable products Paper goods Footwear and headwear Miscellaneous Stone and glass Wood products Animal and vegetable bi-products Animal hides Arts and antiques Weapons

A map of Vietnamese export destinations, 2004

In 2004, Vietnam's exports of merchandise were valued at US$26.5 billion, and were growing rapidly along with imports. Vietnam's principal exports were crude oil (22.1%), textiles and garments (17.1%), footwear (10.5%), fisheries products (9.4%) and electronics (4.1%). The main destinations of Vietnam's exports were the United States (18.8%), Japan (13.2%), China (10.3%), Australia (6.9%), Singapore (5.2%), Germany (4.0%), and the United Kingdom (3.8%).

In 2012, export rose 18.2%, valued at US$114.57 billion. Vietnam's main export market included the EU with US$20 billion, United States with US$19 billion, ASEAN with $US 17.8 billion, Japan with US$13.9 billion, China with US$14.2 billion, and South Korea with US$7 billion.

In 2013, exports rose 15.4%, valued at US$132.17 billion, of which export of electronics now comprised 24.5% of total export, compared with a 4.4% in 2008. Textiles and garments are still an important part in Vietnam's export, valued about US$17.9 billion in 2013.

In 2014, exports rose 13.6%, reaching US$150.1 billion. Electronics and electronics parts, textiles and garments, computers and computer parts are the three main export groups of Vietnam. The United States continued to be Vietnam's largest export market, with US$28.5 billion. The EU is second with US$27.9 billion, ASEAN is third, China is fourth and Japan is the fifth largest export market of Vietnam.

In 2024, Vietnam's exports increased 14.3 percent. Among Vietnam's biggest exports were garments and textiles (US$37 billion), electronics (US$72.6 billion), plastics (US$11.8 billion) and furniture (US$3.4 billion).

==== Imports ====
In 2004, Vietnam's merchandise imports were valued at US$31.5 billion and growing rapidly. Vietnam's principal imports were machinery (17.5%), refined petroleum (11.5%), steel (8.3%), material for the textile industry (7.2%), and cloth (6.0%). The main origins of Vietnam's imports were China (13.9%), Taiwan (11.6%), Singapore (11.3%), Japan (11.1%), South Korea (10.4%), Thailand (5.8%), and Malaysia (3.8%).

Vietnam import rose 6.6% in 2012, valued at US$113.79 billion. Major import countries were China US$29.2 billion, ASEAN with US$22.3 billion, South Korea with US$16.2 billion, Japan with US$13.7 billion, EU with US$10 billion, and United States with US$6.3 billion.

In 2014, imports rose 12.1%, reaching US$148 billion, most of which are materials and machinery needed for export. China continued to be Vietnam's largest import partner, with US$43.7 billion. The ASEAN is second with US$23.1 billion, South Korea is third, Japan is fourth and the EU is the fifth largest import partner of Vietnam.

=== External debt, foreign aid and foreign investment ===
In 2004, external debt amounted to US$16.6 billion, or 37% of GDP.

From 1988 to December 2004, cumulative foreign direct investment (FDI) commitments totaled US$46 billion. By December 2004, about 58% had been dispersed. About half of FDI has been directed at the two major cities (and environs) of Ho Chi Minh City and Hanoi. In 2003, new foreign direct investment commitments were US$1.5 billion. The largest sector by far for licensed FDI is industry and construction. Other sectors attracting FDI are oil and gas, fisheries, construction, agriculture and forestry, transportation and communications, and hotels and tourism. From 2006 to 2010, Vietnam hoped to receive US$18 billion of FDI to support a targeted growth rate in excess of 7%. Despite rising investments, foreign investors still regard Vietnam as a risky destination, as confirmed by recent survey by the Japan External Trade Organization of Japanese companies operating in Vietnam. Many of the respondents complained about high costs of utilities, office rentals and skilled labor. Corruption, bureaucracy, lack of transparent regulations and the failure to enforce investor rights are additional obstacles to investment, according to the U.S. State Department. Vietnam tied with several nations for the 102nd place in Transparencies International's Corruption Perceptions Index in 2004. A study was conducted to examine the effect foreign investment had on corruption in Vietnam. The study concluded that the propensity of foreign firms to bribe at entry is higher in restricted sectors. Also, the removal of investment restrictions leads to reductions in bribery as a result of more Foreign Investment Enterprises, and consequently more competition entering that sector.

The World Bank's assistance program for Vietnam has three objectives: to support Vietnam's transition to a market economy, to enhance equitable and sustainable development and to promote good governance. From 1993 through 2004, Vietnam received pledges of US$29 billion of official development assistance (ODA), of which about US$14 billion, or 49%, has been disbursed. In 2004, international donors pledged ODA of US$2.25 billion, of which US$1.65 billion actually was disbursed. Three donors accounted for 80% of disbursements in 2004: Japan, the World Bank, and the Asian Development Bank. From 2006 to 2010, Vietnam hopes to receive US$14 billion to US$15 billion of ODA.

Pledged foreign direct investment was US$21.3 billion for 2007 and a record US$31.6 billion for the first half of 2008. Mergers and acquisitions have gradually become an important channel of investments in the economy, especially after 2005.

In 2023, Vietnam realised foreign direct investment in the amount of US$23.2 billion and recorded a further US$36.6 billion in registered FDI commitments. In 2025, Vietnam attracted US$38.42 billion in FDI and in 2026, it FDI grew fastest in the first half of the year, increasing by 61% to reach US$34.65 billion.

=== Free trade agreements ===
A map of ASEAN–China Free Trade Area including Vietnam, other free trade deals are with the European Union, Japan, Korea, the Eurasian Economic Union (Russia), India, Australia, New Zealand, Canada, México, Peru and Chile.

- ASEAN Free Trade Area (AFTA)
- ASEAN–Australia–New Zealand Free Trade Area (AANZFTA) is a free trade area between ASEAN and ANZCERTA, signed on 27 February 2009 and coming into effect on 1 January 2010. Details of the AANZFTA agreement are available online.
- ASEAN–China Free Trade Area (ACFTA), in effect as of 1 January 2010
- ASEAN–India Free Trade Area (AIFTA), in effect as of 1 January 2010
- ASEAN–Japan Comprehensive Economic Partnership (AJCEP)
- ASEAN–Korea Free Trade Area (AKFTA), in effect as of 1 January 2010
- Comprehensive Economic Partnership for East Asia
- Comprehensive and Progressive Agreement for Trans-Pacific Partnership.
- On 29 May 2015, Vietnam signed a Free Trade Agreement (FTA) with Eurasian Economic Union.
- European Union-Vietnam Free Trade Agreement (EVFTA) came into effect on 1 August 2020.
- Vietnam-Chile Free Trade Agreement (VCFTA) came into effect on 1 January 2014.
- Vietnam–Korea Free Trade Agreement (VKFTA) came into effect on 20 December 2015.
- Japan–Vietnam Economic Partnership Agreement came into effect on 1 October 2009.
- United Kingdom–Vietnam Free Trade Agreement came into effect on 1 January 2021.

== Economic development strategy ==
=== Trade liberalization ===
Over the past 30 years, Vietnam has signed numerous trade agreements with different partners, promoting the country as one of the main manufacturing hubs in the world. In 1995, Vietnam joined the ASEAN community. In 2000, it signed a free trade agreement with the United States, to be followed by admission to the World Trade Organisation in 2007. Since then, the country has further integrated itself into the world economy with bilateral agreements with other ASEAN countries, China, India, Japan, and Korea, to name a few. Vietnam has actively working with other partners on ratifying the Trans-Pacific Partnership to form CP TPP, or TPP-11, after the withdrawal of the US, in order to promote economic cooperation, regional connectivity and promote economic growth between member countries. The World Bank estimates that the CP TPP would help the country's GDP to grow by 1.1% by 2030 with a boost to productivity. The overall impact of these efforts was the lowering of tariffs on both imports and exports to and from Viet Nam, and an improved trade balance with a surplus of $2.8 billion during the first eight months of 2018 (Vietnam Custom Department). Most recently, on 30 June 2019, Vietnam signed the Free Trade Agreement and Investment Protection Agreement with the EU after 10 years of negotiation, making it only the fourth country in Asia which managed to sign such agreement with the western bloc (after Japan, South Korea, and Singapore)

=== Domestic reform ===
The government has made real effort in changing its mindset toward a more open market economy, lowering the cost of doing business, and putting regulation in place to ensure rights and orders. In 1986 the government passed its first Law on Foreign Investment, allowing foreign companies to operate in Vietnam. Between 1981 and 2005, Vietnam created a new intellectual property law that gradually moved away from the Soviet-style concept of collective ownership. A milestone in this evolution was the Copyright Agreement that Vietnam concluded with the US in 1997, serving primarily the US interest of preventing Vietnam from becoming an international center for illegal copying. The constitution has come a long way since, with the law being revised regularly to cater for a more investor-friendly business environment while aiming to reduce red-tape and accelerate foreign investment into the country. The Global Competitiveness Report by World Economic Forum placed Vietnam at 55th in 2017, rising from 77th place in 2006. In the World Bank's Ease of Doing Business rankings, Vietnam also rose from 104th place in 2007 to 68th place in 2017. The Bank commended Vietnam on progress made in enforcing contracts, increasing access to credit and basic infrastructure, and trading, among other factors.

Rainer Zitelmann noted in 2023 that due to increasing economic freedom, the portion of Vietnamese living in poverty was 80% in 1993, 50% in 2006, and 5% in 2020.

=== Human and physical capital investment ===
Vietnam invested a lot in its human capital and infrastructure. With a growing population – 100 million as of 2024, up from 60 million in 1986, and more than half are under the age of 35– Vietnam made large public investments in education, especially making primary education universal and compulsory. This was necessary, given the country's export-led growth strategy, where literacy for the mass workforce is deemed important for growth in the manufacturing sector. On the other hand, Vietnam also invested heavily in infrastructure, ensuring cheap mass access to necessities like electricity, water, and especially the internet. These two factors together helped Vietnam to become a hub for foreign investment and manufacturing in Southeast Asia. Japanese and Korean electronics companies like Samsung, LG, Olympus, and Pioneer built factories, and countless European and American apparel makers set up textile operations in the country. Intel opened a $1 billion chip factory in 2010, signalling the importance of Vietnam's strategic positioning in the eyes of the international business community.

=== Sustainable growth ===
Economic growth in Vietnam was considered as broadly in line with other developing countries. The Inclusive Development Index by WEF put Vietnam in a group of countries that have done particularly well and advancing in the ranking of the world's most inclusive economies. This has been notably evident with the role of women participating in the economy. Their labor force participation rate is within 10% of that of men, a smaller gap than many other countries according to World Bank, and in 2015 women-led households are generally not poorer than those led by men. Primary and secondary enrollment rates for boys and girls are also essentially the same, and more girls continue studying in high school than boys. The government is actively reviewing and adjusting its policy, as shown in the current official Development Strategy Action Plan 2011–2020, to develop appropriate mechanisms for a more equitable growth across the country; promoting the advantages of each regions, working in collaboration with each other to support and amplify the fruit of development.

In 2017, with the help of the United Nations, Vietnam official started the ground work to achieve the Sustainable Development Goals with the development of the "One Strategic Plan", integrating the SDGs with the nation's Socio-Economic Development Strategy (2011–2020) and Socio-Economic Development Plan (2016–2020). The OSP can be used as a guideline for government agencies to implement the SDGs in the most effective ways, focusing on areas of importance, such as: investing in people, climate resilience and environmental sustainability, prosperity and partnership, justice and inclusive governance. Vietnam has also developed a National Action Plan to review current growth policies and update these to align with the interest of the SDGs. This is done in consultation with ministries, local governments, and other stakeholders so that a common framework can be set forward.

== Economic indicators and international rankings ==
Organization	Title	Year	Ranking
BSA (The Software Alliance)	The IT Industry Competitiveness Index	2011	53 out of 66
International Monetary Fund	Gross Domestic Product (PPP)	2020	23 out of 190
World Economic Forum	Global Competitiveness	2019	67 out of 141
World Bank	Ease of Doing Business	2018	68 out of 190
The Heritage Foundation/The Wall Street Journal	Index of Economic Freedom	2019	128 out of 180 – mostly unfree (2019)
Transparency International	Corruption Perceptions Index	2019	96 out of 177

== See also ==
- List of companies of Vietnam
- List of largest companies in Vietnam
- List of Vietnamese people by net worth
- List of Vietnamese subdivisions by GDP
- Socialist-oriented market economy
- Provincial Competitiveness Index
- Corruption in Vietnam
- Corporate law in Vietnam
- Bamboo network
- Tiger Cub Economies
- Vietnam Chamber of Commerce and Industry
- Vietnam Consumer Confidence Index
- Vietnam Investor Confidence Index
- Vietnam and the World Bank
- Vietnam and the International Monetary Fund
- Pensions in Vietnam
- Child labour in Vietnam
- Poverty in Vietnam
- Vietnam General Confederation of Labour

== Literature ==
- Jandl, Thomas (2013). Vietnam in the Global Economy. Lexington Books.
