= Malesky =

Malesky is a surname. Notable people with the surname include:

- Edmund Malesky, American political scientist
- Kee Malesky (1950–2025), American research librarian
