= Vietnam and the International Monetary Fund =

Vietnam joined the International Monetary Fund (IMF) on September 21, 1956, under the policy of Article VIII. Their quota contributes an estimated SDR of 1,153 millions and voting power of 0.24%. As of August 2016, the current IMF Resident Representative to Vietnam is Jonathan Dunn.

Following the events of the Vietnam War, most trade and financial relations between Vietnam and foreign entities was severely restricted. The Soviet Union remained one of the few nations with continued contact with the financial institutions in Vietnam. After the Vietnamese withdrawal from Cambodia in 1989, Japan was among the first to express a desire to resume financial aid relations with Vietnam. Japan and France endeavored to reestablish Vietnam's involvement in the IMF but were met with resistance from the United States who were seeking to use the restrictions to the pressure the nation to cooperate in establishing the whereabouts of missing US military service members.

Informal contact between the IMF and Vietnam was reestablished in the later part of the 1980s. The US voted down most efforts to establish continued relations and financial assistance from the IMF to Vietnam until the early 1990s. A preliminary formal agreement for financial support was not reached until October 1993 and codified in a full agreement a year after that.

So far they have taken about two ECF type loans, one on April 13, 2001, which estimated 290 SDR million, and the other on November 11, 1994, which had reached about 145 SDR million.

In 1998, Vietnam was in slow recovery of its economy after the Southeast Asia Economic Crisis. As a member of ASEAN, their best solution was to heavily rely on loans from the IMF. In 1999, IMF warned that the federal direct investment into Vietnam was too concentrated in the "import substituting and non-tradable" sectors like construction and telecommunication as opposed to investment in exportable goods and services.

In 2001, Vietnam sent a letter of intent to the IMF to receive a loan to fund the Poverty Reductions and Growth Funds arrangement. In order to create a greater macroeconomic stability for Vietnam they would rely on the monetary policy while under shock scenarios as it has proven to lift off interest rates. According to IMF records, Vietnam is still paying that loan and continues their membership with the IMF.

Since 2012, the Vietnamese dong closely tied to the U.S. dollar. Every year or two Vietnam undergoes a cycle staff report based on Article IV Consultation and hold discussions of their economic developments. As of July 2016, Vietnam has found some promising progress as they have decreased their poverty rate by one percent and managed to lower their inflation. Their main source of exports are crude oil, electronics, coffee, rice, and rubber, while their key export buyers are the US, Japan, and the developing members of ASEAN.

As of July 2017, IMF credits Vietnam's economy with "growth momentum [that] remains robust underpinned by strong manufacturing activity and foreign direct investment." In an earlier April 2017 report, the IMF had warned that countries with significant amount of exports to the US have seen "relatively weak" share prices.

As of 2023, Vietnam has not needed to borrow from the International Monetary Fund since 1995. It had borrowed in 1993 and additional loans in 1994 before Vietnam started to pay some back every year until they paid it all back in 2012. They had borrowed money from the IMF to alleviate poverty and its economy after being affected by war. After 2012, its status with the IMF is no purchases and no loans. Regarding its quota contributions, it still holds 1153.1 million SDR in the organization.

According to the IMF, Vietnam was not severely impacted by the COVID-19 pandemic, additionally, it did not need to take any loans out from the IMF. The IMF also assessed that Vietnam did not experience any population decline but instead saw population growth, along with a stabilizing economy. Despite the disruption that the pandemic has caused, Vietnam's not on the IMF's concern list.

Vietnam receives recommendations from the IMF to improve its economy on a '12-month consultation cycle'. The IMF also makes yearly assessments on whether the IMF should intervene or not which it seems like they would like to. But the IMF has been involved with some projects and provided technical assistance to Vietnam. Technical assistance programs target different aspects of Vietnam's economy financially.

Foreign Direct Investment (FDI) has helped Vietnam regarding infrastructure. There has been a total of 7,058 licensed projects involving foreign direct investment which has bought in capital over the years. It has impacted Vietnam's economy and helped them turn things around. Similarly to some Asian countries, FDI has helped bring in revenue from foreign investors.
