= Edmund Malesky =

American political scientist

Edmund J. Malesky
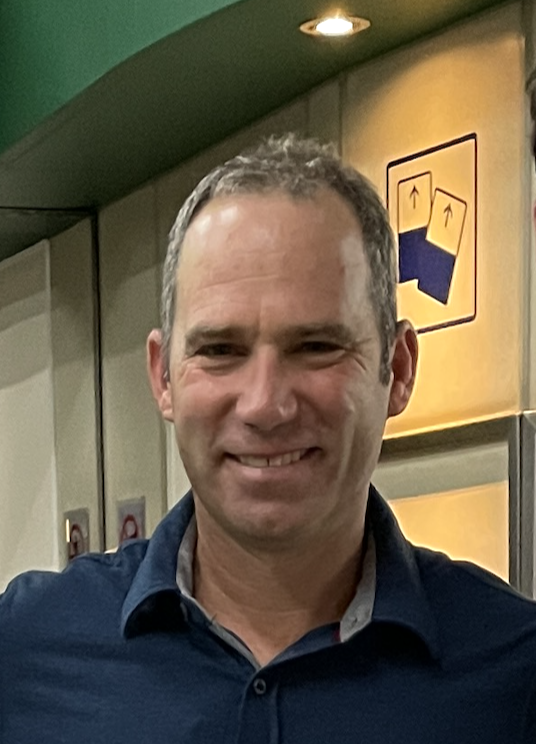

Academic background
- Education: Georgetown University (BS); Duke University (MA, PhD)

Edmund J. Malesky is an American political scientist specializing in Southeast Asia. A scholar of Vietnam, Malesky currently serves as a professor at Duke University and Director of the Duke Center for International Development in the Sanford School of Public Policy.

Malesky served as the lead researcher for the Vietnam Provincial Competitiveness Index, and chairs the Southeast Asia Research Group.

== Publications ==
- China's Governance Puzzle: Enabling Transparency and Participation in a Single-Party State (2017)
- Incentives to Pander: How Politicians Use Corporate Welfare for Political Gain (2018)
