= Child labour in Vietnam =

Many children in Vietnam have to work to support their families rather than being able to attend school.

The Labor newspaper reported that 30 percent of Vietnamese children between the age of six to seventeen join the labor force. Most children stay close to home to help their family business. However, a report released by the Ministry of Labor – Invalid and Social Affairs in 2008 showed that there are 26,027 children that are in hard labor conditions in hazardous environment such as gold mines, timber operations or cargo transport. The actual number could be much larger as children employed as domestic servants, restaurant assistants or children working on the streets as beggars, shoes shiners or newspaper and lottery sellers were not covered in the report. The report also revealed that up to 62 out of 173 manufacturing factories in Ho Chi Minh City employed child laborers, 50 percent of whom are below 15 years old. The working environment of the employed generally includes long hours of work, low wages, poor facilities and even physical and mental abuse.

In December 2014, the U.S. Department of Labor's List of Goods Produced by Child Labor or Forced Labor reported bricks and garments as goods produced in such working conditions in Vietnam.

Although Vietnamese law prohibits the employment of children under the age of 15, the system has too many loopholes to provide children with the level of protection that they really need. These laws are not aggressively enforced, allowing employers to continue employing child labor without any ramifications. In addition, child labor remains a controversial issue in Vietnam as many people believe that children should share the workload and household responsibilities with their family. These are just a few reasons why child labor is still a serious problem in Vietnam. However, attitudes towards child labor are shifting. The Vietnamese government has been putting in more effort to tackle the problem. For example, Vietnam has been teaming up with the International Labor Organization to raise public awareness on children protection, bringing children back to school and helping rescued children.
