= Provincial Competitiveness Index =

The Provincial Competitiveness Index (PCI) in Vietnam is designed to assess and rank the performance, capacity and willingness of provincial governments to develop business-friendly regulatory environments for private sector development. The fourth iteration, PCI 2008, once again validates that economic governance does matter. At each level of initial conditions, better-governed provinces are able to not only use their endowments more efficiently but also influence business performance and income in subsequent years.

The PCI is the result of a major, ongoing collaborative effort between the Vietnam Chamber of Commerce and Industry (VCCI) and the U.S. Agency for International Development(USAID)-funded Vietnam Competitiveness Initiative (VNCI), managed by DAI, with a substantial contribution by VNCI partner The Asia Foundation (TAF).

The PCI has its origins in an earlier study by the Asia Foundation (TAF) and VCCI. This study, titled "Best Practices in Provincial Economic Governance" was undertaken in 2003–2004 and covered 14 non-metropolitan provinces. Although based upon a different methodology, the PCI used the same survey instrument as that developed for the TAF-VCCI study.

Edmund Malesky of the University of California – San Diego led the development of the PCI's research methodology and authored the presentation of its analytical findings.

VNCI and VCCI are planning to jointly produce the PCI on an annual basis. This will allow provinces to track their progress over time, not only in terms of relative rankings, but also in terms of absolute scores.

== Rank ==
Rank	Province	2006	2007	2008	2009	2010	2011	2012	2013	2014	2015
1	An Giang province	60.45	66.47	61.12	62.42	61.94	62.22	63.42	59.07	58.10	57.61
2	Bà Rịa–Vũng Tàu province	56.90	65.63	60.51	65.96	60.55	66.13	59.14	56.99	59.05	59.51
3	Bạc Liêu province	42.89	42.49	40.92	52.04	58.20	63.99	62.85	59.89	59.50	58.44
4	Bắc Giang province	56.99	55.48	47.44	57.50	58.02	60.79	57.08	54.79	57.33	57.61
5	Bắc Kạn province	48.73	46.47	39.78	47.50	51.09	52.71	51.00	53.53	53.02	53.20
6	Bắc Ninh province	54.74	58.96	59.57	65.70	64.48	67.27	62.26	61.07	60.92	59.91
7	Bến Tre province	53.11	62.88	62.42	64.09	63.11	59.90	58.35	62.78	59.70	60.10
8	Bình Dương province	76.23	77.20	71.76	74.04	65.72	60.79	59.64	58.15	58.82	58.89
9	Bình Định province	66.49	69.46	60.67	65.97	60.37	52.71	63.06	59.37	59.72	59.23
10	Bình Phước province	46.29	50.38	53.71	56.15	57.24	65.87	55.82	57.47	57.79	56.41
11	Bình Thuận province	52.66	57.66	58.75	64.96	58.45	59.90	54.08	59.09	59.16	58.83
12	Cà Mau province	43.99	56.19	58.64	61.96	53.57	59.43	53.76	53.80	53.22	54.40
13	Cao Bằng province	46.63	40.18	41.02	45.43	53.56	50.98	50.55	52.30	52.04	54.44
14	Cần Thơ	58.30	61.76	56.32	62.17	62.46	62.66	60.32	61.46	59.94	59.81
15	Đà Nẵng	75.39	72.96	72.18	75.96	69.77	66.98	61.71	66.45	66.87	68.34
16	Đắk Lắk province	51.65	51.05	53.33	57.37	57.20	53.46	55.94	57.13	58.76	59.00
17	Đắk Nông province	38.95	37.96	41.01	46.96	48.91	52.87	53.91	54.68	53.90	48.96
18	Điện Biên province	42.28	41.70	36.39	59.32	55.12	59.96	45.12	56.23	50.32	56.48
19	Đồng Nai province	64.64	62.33	59.42	63.16	59.49	64.77	62.29	56.93	57.26	57.79
20	Đồng Tháp province	58.13	64.89	64.64	68.54	67.22	67.06	63.79	63.35	65.28	66.39
21	Gia Lai province	53.06	56.16	51.82	56.01	53.45	55.07	56.50	57.96	56.16	50.45
22	Hà Giang province	48.49	54.59	48.18	58.16	53.94	57.62	53.00	55.04	52.47	50.45
23	Hà Nam province	47.27	51.29	55.13	56.89	52.19	51.58	51.92	57.81	56.57	58.49
24	Hà Nội	50.34	56.73	53.94	58.18	55.73	58.28	53.40	57.67	58.89	59.00
25	Hà Tĩnh province	42.36	45.56	47.44	55.26	57.22	65.97	56.27	55.88	58.19	57.20
26	Hải Dương province	52.70	53.23	54.07	58.96	57.31	58.41	56.29	56.37	58.63	58.37
27	Hải Phòng	49.98	53.19	47.68	57.57	54.64	57.07	53.58	59.76	58.25	58.65
28	Hậu Giang province	52.61	59.41	55.34	64.38	63.91	57.40	62.01	59.29	58.91	58.33
29	Hòa Bình province	50.17	50.18	48.35	47.82	49.89	56.52	55.51	52.15	56.57	57.13
30	Hưng Yên province	56.91	57.47	57.53	61.31	49.37	59.29	58.01	53.91	55.14	55.10
31	Khánh Hòa province	55.33	52.42	52.12	58.66	56.75	59.11	58.82	57.49	59.78	58.69
32	Kiên Giang province	51.27	52.82	52.23	63.04	58.90	59.98	62.96	63.55	61.10	60.31
33	Kon Tum province	41.38	44.54	41.94	54.28	57.01	57.10	51.39	56.04	54.66	56.55
34	Lai Châu province	36.76	38.19	43.95	55.55	51.22	60.36	52.47	55.78	50.60	52.77
35	Lạng Sơn province	49.64	43.23	45.63	52.52	50.30	54.26	56.29	52.76	55.05	54.61
36	Lào Cai province	64.11	66.95	61.22	70.47	67.97	73.53	63.08	59.43	64.67	62.32
37	Lâm Đồng province	52.25	49.85	48.10	52.93	58.26	51.75	52.84	57.22	58.79	59.04
38	Long An province	50.40	58.82	63.99	64.44	62.74	67.12	60.21	59.36	61.37	60.86
39	Nam Định province	48.89	51.76	49.52	52.60	55.63	55.48	52.23	56.31	58.52	59.62
40	Nghệ An province	54.43	49.76	48.46	52.56	52.38	55.46	54.36	55.83	58.82	58.47
41	Ninh Bình province	56.82	57.67	56.14	58.31	62.85	61.12	58.87	58.71	60.75	58.51
42	Ninh Thuận province	45.82	47.33	47.82	54.91	56.61	57.00	59.76	54.22	56.88	57.45
43	Phú Thọ province	54.42	55.64	52.49	53.40	52.47	60.31	55.54	53.91	57.72	58.37
44	Phú Yên province	54.93	57.87	51.24	54.77	58.18	55.15	53.36	54.48	56.44	56.15
45	Quảng Bình province	47.90	49.51	44.17	55.68	55.32	58.16	55.84	58.25	56.50	56.71
46	Quảng Nam province	56.42	62.92	59.97	61.08	59.34	63.40	60.27	58.76	59.97	61.06
47	Quảng Ngãi province	44.20	51.39	50.05	52.34	52.21	62.24	58.33	62.60	59.55	59.70
48	Quảng Ninh province	53.25	58.34	54.30	60.81	64.41	63.25	59.55	63.51	62.16	65.75
49	Quảng Trị province	52.08	51.10	50.72	55.32	61.68	63.08	55.91	53.13	55.07	57.32
50	Sóc Trăng province	55.34	64.68	54.24	56.63	61.49	62.68	55.01	58.97	58.13	59.04
51	Sơn La province	45.22	50.35	46.60	53.40	49.26	54.32	58.99	53.86	55.28	57.21
52	Tây Ninh province	48.35	53.92	45.09	59.03	57.93	60.43	51.95	61.15	59.62	59.66
53	Thái Bình province	50.54	55.99	54.27	54.58	60.04	53.69	58.37	59.10	57.37	57.64
54	Thái Nguyên province	52.71	52.02	46.03	58.58	56.54	53.57	60.07	58.96	61.25	61.21
55	Thanh Hóa province	45.30	52.82	46.22	57.32	55.68	60.62	55.11	61.59	60.33	60.74
56	Thừa Thiên Huế province	50.53	62.44	60.71	64.23	61.31	60.95	57.12	65.56	59.98	58.52
57	Tiền Giang province	52.18	64.63	57.27	65.81	59.63	59.58	57.63	57.19	55.11	56.74
58	Hồ Chí Minh City	63.39	64.83	60.15	63.22	59.67	61.93	61.19	61.19	62.73	61.36
59	Trà Vinh province	56.83	56.30	55.17	63.22	65.80	57.56	62.75	60.87	58.58	57.55
60	Tuyên Quang province	47.21	52.13	52.09	57.92	57.90	53.67	47.81	48.98	55.20	56.81
61	Vĩnh Long province	64.67	70.14	64.97	67.24	63.40	54.10	62.97	59.73	59.54	59.49
62	Vĩnh Phúc province	61.27	66.06	69.37	66.65	61.73	62.57	55.15	58.86	61.81	62.56
63	Yên Bái province	56.85	59.73	57.79	61.71	60.16	63.05	55.36	52.67	54.77	56.64
