= United States–Vietnam trade relations =

U.S. - Vietnam Trade Relations refer to the bilateral trade relationship between the United States of America (U.S.) and the Socialist Republic of Vietnam (Vietnam) from 1990s to 2012. After more than two decades of no economic relationship since the end of the Vietnam War, the two governments reestablished economic relationship during the 1990s. The bilateral trade between the U.S. and Vietnam grew slowly afterwards, and it has developed rapidly after the signing of the U.S.-Vietnam Bilateral Trade Agreement in December 2001. Total bilateral trade turnover has increased 1200% from $1.5 billion in 2001 to over $20 billion in 2011. The bilateral trade relations further developed after the U.S. granted Vietnam permanent normal trade relations (PNTR) status as part of Vietnam’s accession to the World Trade Organization (WTO) in 2007. The U.S. and Vietnam also came to a Trade and Investment Framework Agreement (TIFA) in 2007. Vietnam was recently the United States' 26th largest goods imports partner with $17.5 billion in 2011, and was the 45th largest goods export market with $3.7 billion in 2010. Vietnam with six other partners are now in the ongoing Trans-Pacific Partnership (TPP) negotiations with the U.S. The growth in bilateral trade has also been accompanied by issues and problems, e.g. anti-dumping cases, worker’s rights, non-market economy, Intellectual Property Rights (IPR) protection and Vietnam’s exchange rate policy.

== History ==
=== The normalization process (1975-2000) ===
After the Vietnam War ended in 1975, the U.S. and Vietnam maintained no economic relation for more than two decades. Washington extended President Richard Nixon’s 1964 trade embargo to all of Vietnam and all bilateral trade activities were prohibited. The Ronald Reagan and George H. W. Bush Administrations’ joint efforts to resolve the remains of U.S. servicemen missing in action (MIA) had set the foundation for the normalization of bilateral trade relations between the two nations during the Clinton Administration. On February 3, 1994, President Bill Clinton ordered the lifting of the U.S. trade embargo on Vietnam. Three years later, in 1997, Pete Peterson was appointed as the first U.S. Ambassador to Vietnam since 1975. The two governments signed the first bilateral trade agreement (BTA) on July 13, 2000.

=== Key trade agreements and frameworks (2001-2012) ===
U.S.-Vietnam Bilateral Trade Agreement (BTA): Negotiated between 1995 and 2000 by Chief negotiator Nguyen Dinh Luong on Vietnam side and Joe Damond from USTR. The BTA was signed on 14 July 2000 with the presence and formal testimony of Bill Clinton who had just landed from Camp David.

The BTA went into force at a Blair House ceremony with Deputy Prime Minister Nguyen Tan Dung, Trade Minister Vu Khoan and U.S. Trade Representative Robert Zoellick on December 10, 2001. The BTA extended to Vietnam “conditional most favored nation (MFN) trade status”, also known as “normal trade relations” (NTR). On December 29, 2006, President George W. Bush granted the permanent normal trade relations (PNTR) status to Vietnam which was part of Vietnam’s accession to the World Trade Organization (WTO). Bilateral trade relations have developed more quickly since the signing of the BTA. The U.S. government has approved annual appropriations with the amount of $4–5 million to support Vietnam’s economic reforms.

U.S. - Vietnam Trade and Investment Framework and Agreement (TIFA): Vietnam’s accession to WTO as the 150th member accelerated the process of addressing economic and legal reform issues in the U.S.-Vietnam Trade and Investment Framework (TIFA) negotiations. Two governments concluded TIFA in 2007. Since then, the U.S. and Vietnam’s representatives have met on a regular basis under the TIFA to discuss about the implementation process of Vietnam’s WTO commitments.

Trans-Pacific Partnership (TPP): In 2010, together with six other partners (Brunei Darussalem, Chile, Malaysia, New Zealand, Peru, and Singapore), U.S. and Vietnam started the negotiations for a Trans-Pacific Partnership (TPP) regional free trade agreement. The U.S. seeks to “develop a high-standard, 21st-century regional trade agreement that will support the creation and retention of jobs in the United States and promote economic growth”. The goal of the TPP is to become a potential platform for “economic integration across the Asia-Pacific region that will advance United States’ and Vietnam’s economic interests". Awareness of TPP among Vietnamese political and business circles has been rising during Vietnam's economic turmoil, 2008-2013, leading to the Vietnamese government' stronger push for this membership.

=== Trade Pressures and Immigration Agreements (2025- ) ===
In March 2025, Vietnam agreed to expedite the deportation of Vietnamese nationals from the U.S. following threats of trade tariffs and visa sanctions from the Trump administration.

In a phone call with U.S. President Donald Trump on 4 April, the General Secretary of the Communist Party of Vietnam Tô Lâm offered a "0%" tariff on American goods in exchange for lowering and eliminating tariffs against Vietnam, which Trump praised in a Truth Social post.

On October 26, 2025, the United States and Vietnam established a framework for an "Agreement on Reciprocal, Fair, and Balanced Trade" to boost bilateral commerce and narrow Vietnam's trade surplus. Under the agreement, the U.S. will maintain a 20% reciprocal tariff on most Vietnamese goods (down from a previously announced 40% levy on trans-shipments) while identifying products eligible for 0% tariffs. In exchange, Vietnam pledged preferential access for American goods, agreed to streamline non-tariff barriers across motor vehicles, medical devices and pharmaceuticals, and committed to strengthening intellectual property protections and supply chain enforcement. The framework coincided with major commercial deals, including Vietnam Airlines purchasing 50 Boeing aircraft worth over $8 billion and Vietnamese firms signing $2.9 billion in MOUs for U.S. agricultural commodities.

== Trade figures ==
=== U.S. Trade in goods with Vietnam (from 1992-2025) ===
Table 1:U.S. Trade in goods with Vietnam (from 1992–2025)(in $ million)

Year	Exports	Imports	Balance
2025	15,603.3	193,879.3	-178,276.0
2024	13,068.3	136,317.6	-123,249.3
2023	9,812.2	114,382.9	-104,570.7
2022	11,334.6	127,446.8	-116,112.3
2021	11,020.2	101,938.9	-90,918.7
2020	9,915.4	79,582.3	-69,667.0
2019	10,822.1	66,437.3	-55,615.2
2018	9,675.6	49,139.5	-39,463.9
2017	8,134.1	46,477.4	-38,343.3
2016	10,098.4	42,085.5	-31,987.0
2015	7,100.6	38,014.9	-30,914.4
2014	5,732.5	30,617.7	-24,885.2
2013	5,036.8	24,651.0	-19,614.3
2012	4,622.9	20,267.7	-15,644.8
2011	4,315.2	17,487.8	-13,172.6
2010	3,705.5	14,867.9	-11,162.3
2009	3,097.2	12,287.8	-9,190.6
2008	2,789.4	12,901.1	-10,111.6
2007	1,903.1	10,632.8	-8,729.8
2006	1,100.3	8,566.7	-7,466.4
2005	1,193.2	6,631.2	-5,438.0
2004	1,105.5	5,275.3	-4,169.8
2003	1,323.8	4,554.8	-3,231.1
2002	580.0	2,394.8	-1,814.8
2001	460.4	1,053.2	-592.8
2000	367.5	821.3	-453.8
1999	291.5	608.4	-316.9
1998	273.9	554.1	-208.2
1997	286.7	388.4	-101.7
1996	616.6	331.8	284.8
1995	252.3	199.0	53.3
1994	172.9	50.5	122.4
1993	7.0	0.0	7.0
1992	4.6	0.0	4.6

=== U.S. Vietnam trade in total (2001-2011) ===
U.S.-Vietnam trade figures have grown in pace with Vietnam’s per capita GDP (see Chart 1)

Chart 1: Vietnam GDP and U.S.-Vietnam Trade Bilateral Trade Growth

=== U.S.-Vietnam trade products (2009) ===
(see Chart 2)

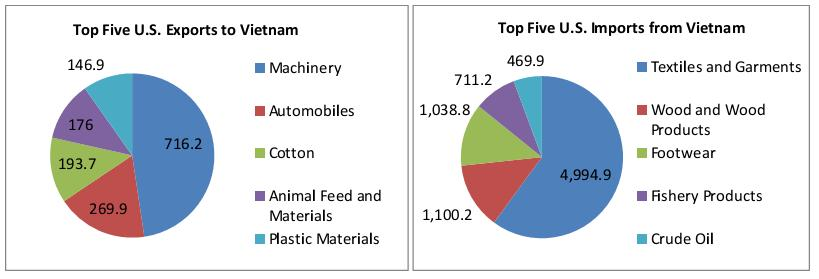
Chart 2: 2009 U.S.-Vietnam Trade Products (in millions of U.S. dollars)

== Trade issues ==
The growth in bilateral trade between the U.S. and Vietnam has also been accompanied by many issues and problems. During Vietnam’s application to the U.S. Generalized System of Preferences (GSP) program and negotiation of a Bilateral Investment Treaty (BIT) with the U.S., U.S government has hesitated in accepting Vietnam’s application and in concluding a BIT with Vietnam. The rapid increase in the imports of specific products from Vietnam (e.g. clothing, frozen fish fillets) have led to the creation of a controversial import monitoring program in the U.S., and to anti-dumping ruling against Vietnam.

The 111th U.S. Congress has included “workers’ rights, the designation of Vietnam as a non-market economy, intellectual property rights (IPR) protection, and Vietnam’s exchange rate policy” as the most prominent economic issues which influence relations between the U.S. and Vietnam. Two governments is now seeking to resolve the preceding issues in recent meetings under the TIFA.

On 1 January 2026, the US National Oceanic and Atmospheric Administration imposed a ban on the importation of fishery products from 12 Vietnamese fishing grounds, citing their failure to meet the standards of the Marine Mammal Protection Act.

== See also ==
- United States-Vietnam relations
- Vietnam - New Pathway of an Economy - Nguyen Dinh Luong - Amazon Kindle Publishing - Published in Feb. 2022
