= Vietnam and the World Bank =

Vietnam's relationship with the World Bank

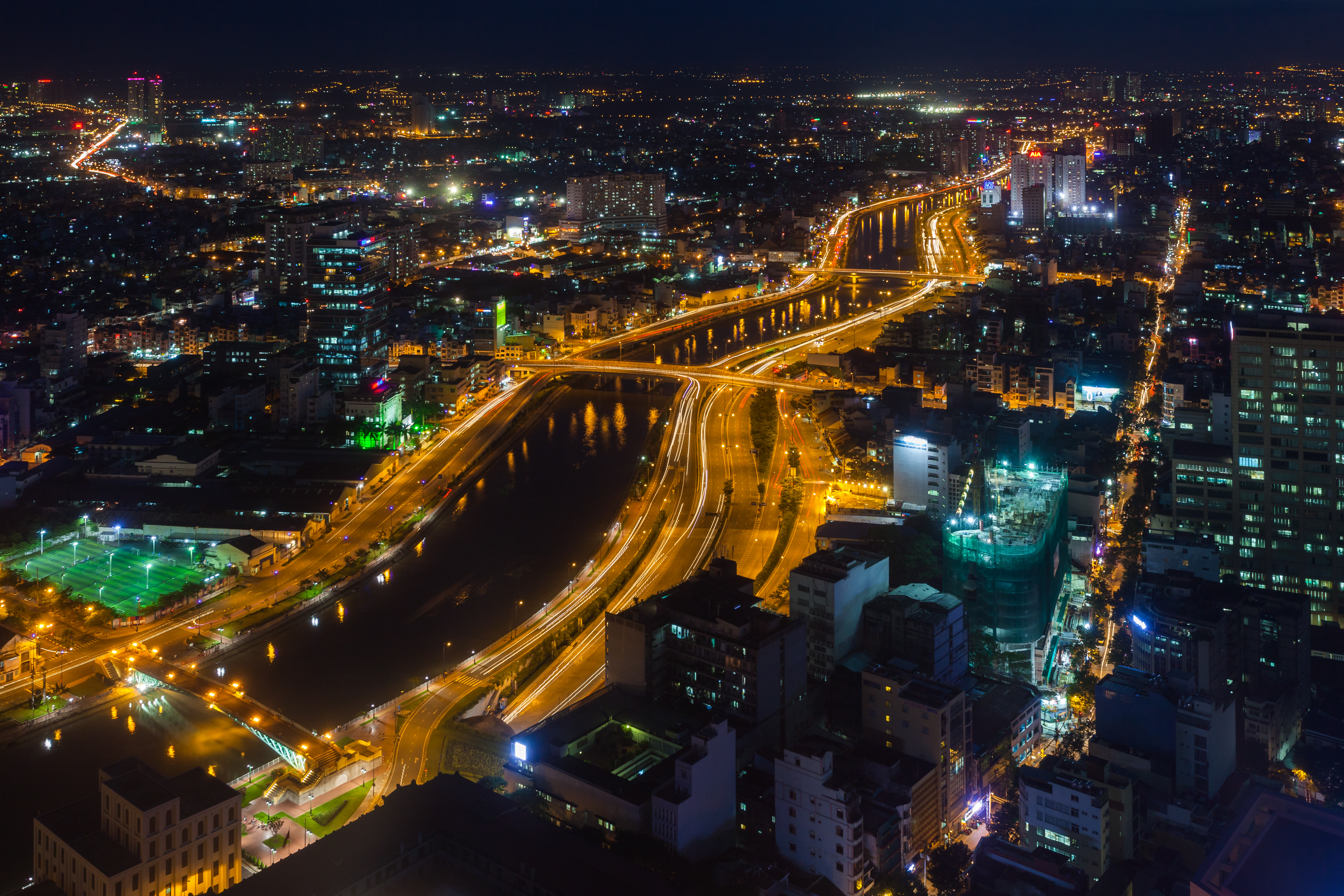
As Vietnam's economic center and its largest city by population, Ho Chi Minh City has grown into a metropolis and gained significant development.

Vietnam joined the World Bank Group (WBG) on 21 September 1956. Before the mid-1980s, Vietnam was one of the world's least developed countries. A series of economic and political reforms launched in 1986, known as Đổi Mới, caused Vietnam to experience rapid economic growth and development, becoming an upper middle-income country. The World Bank (WB) has maintained a development partnership with Vietnam since 1993. As of 25 March 2019, it has committed a total of US$24 billion in loans, credits, and grants to Vietnam through 165 operations and projects, 44 of which are active as of 2019 and comprise US$9 billion. With an estimated extreme poverty rate below 3% and a GDP growth rate of 7.1% in 2018, Vietnam's economy continues to show fundamental strength and is supported by robust domestic demand and export-oriented manufacturing.

In an effort to support the reforms in Vietnam and foster the country's shift from a centrally planned to a market-based economy, the WB's partnership with Vietnam has witnessed more than 270 projects or advisory and analytic activities conducted through strategic partnerships with four of the WBG's five organizations, covering areas including poverty reduction, education, rural and urban services, infrastructure, new energy, and environmental protection. The WB and the government of Vietnam have made joint efforts to improve Vietnam's development, including strengthening competitiveness, improving sustainability, and increasing opportunities for the poor.

In terms of future planning, Vietnam and the WB are prioritizing "inclusive growth, investment in people, environmental sustainability and good governance", as illustrated in the new Country Partnership Framework (CPF), which was approved and endorsed by the WBG in May 2017. Based on analyses from two previous reports, the CPF introduced several strategic shifts, including strengthening private sector development, supporting financial sustainability and poverty reduction, improving education, and promoting low carbon energy generation.

== Background ==
Founded in the 1940s, the World Bank (WB) is an international financial institution. The WB has evolved into the World Bank Group (WBG), which consists of five closely related institutions: the International Development Association (IDA), the International Bank for Reconstruction and Development (IBRD), the International Finance Corporation (IFC), the Multilateral Investment Guarantee Agency (MIGA), and the International Center for Settlement of Investment Disputes (ICSID). According to the WB website, the term "World Bank" refers only to the IBRD and IDA, which "provide low-interest loans, interest-free credit, and grants to developing countries".

Vietnam joined the WBG on 21 September 1956. Before the mid-1980s, Vietnam was one of the world's least developed countries. Under Đổi Mới, which were a series of economic and political reforms launched in 1986, Vietnam experienced rapid economic growth and development, becoming a lower middle-income country. The WB has maintained a development partnership with Vietnam since 1993. As of 25 March 2019, it has committed a total of US$24 billion in loans, credits, and grants to Vietnam through 165 operations and projects, 44 of which are active as of 2019 and comprise US$9 billion. With an estimated extreme poverty rate below 3% and a GDP growth rate of 7.1% in 2018, Vietnam's economy continues to show fundamental strength and is supported by robust domestic demand and export-oriented manufacturing.

== Strategic partnerships ==
In an effort to support the reforms in Vietnam and foster the country's shift from a centrally planned economy to market-based economy, the WB's partnership with Vietnam has witnessed more than 270 projects or advisory and analytic activities conducted through strategic partnerships with four of the WBG's five organizations, covering areas including poverty reduction, education, rural and urban services, infrastructure, new energy, and environmental protection. The WB and the government of Vietnam have made joint efforts to improve Vietnam's development, including strengthening competitiveness, improving sustainability, and increasing opportunities for the poor.

Vietnam joined the IDA on 24 September 1960, the IBRD on 21 September 1956, the IFC on 4 August 1967, and the MIGA on 5 October 1994.

=== IDA ===
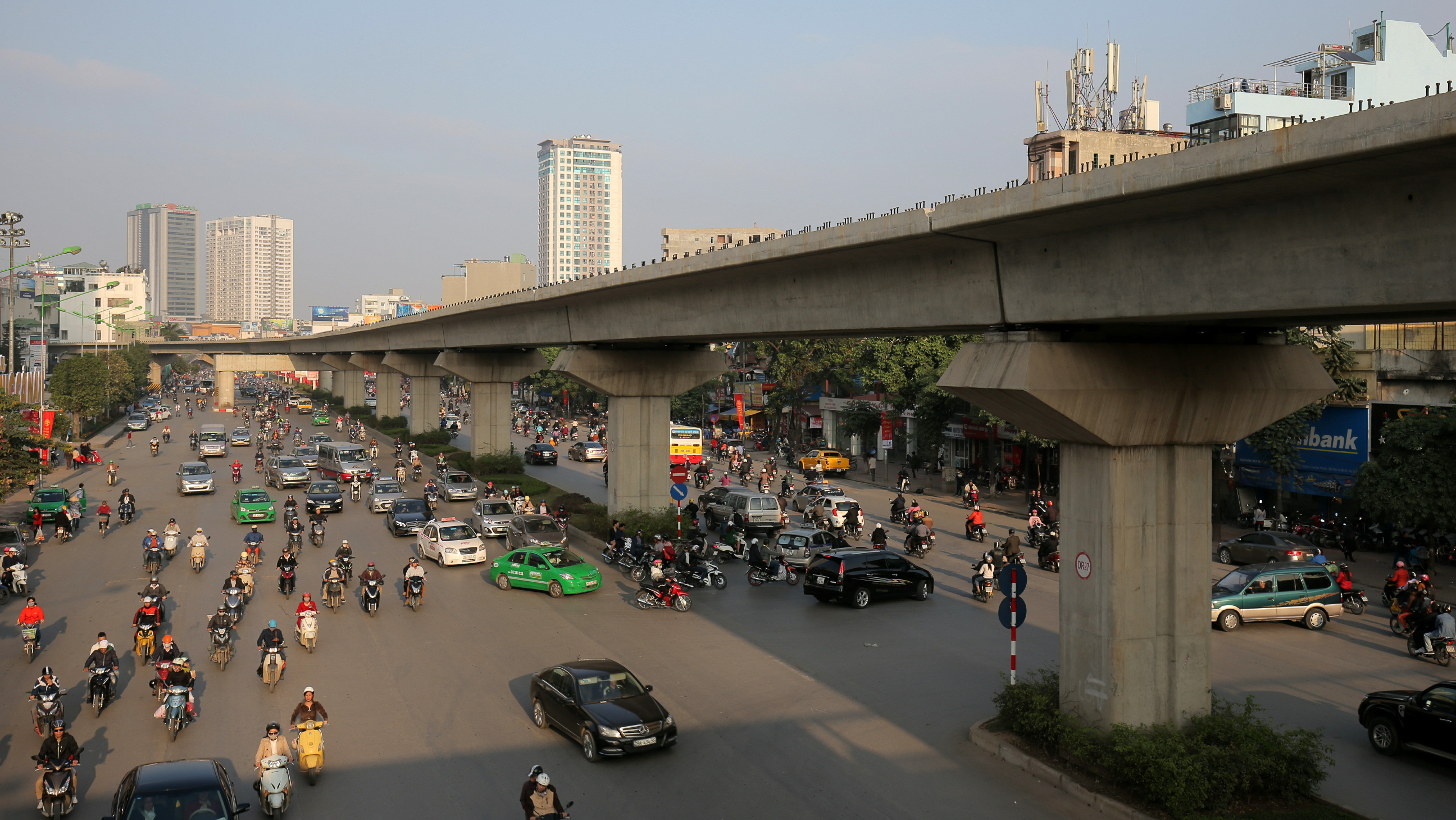
The Metro Line 2 was under construction in Hanoi in 2016.

As of 31 July 2019, the IDA has provided Vietnam with credits totaling about US$20.95 billion and grants totaling US$35 million, which supported more than 160 projects covering sectors such as public administration, water supply and sanitation, waste management, health, social protection, agriculture, education, and transportation. Of the 169 projects, 43 are active (as of 2019) and 7 have been dropped. In 2018, the Dynamic City Integrated Development project was approved to further improve urban infrastructure and urban management.

The Independent Evaluation Group (IEG) evaluates the development effectiveness of the WBG and over the past decade has assessed IDA projects in Vietnam as generally positive; most project ratings were moderately satisfactory or better. However, due to more complicated project designs, deficient performance evaluation, and the postponement of remedy measures, a tendency for outcome ratings to decline has been seen in more recent years.

=== IBRD ===
In 2009, the IBRD approved its first loan, of US$500 million, to Vietnam "to support public investment reforms". As of 31 July 2019, the IBRD had financed 16 projects in Vietnam, with a total lending portfolio of about US$3.46 billion. The projects funded cover sectors including public administration, sanitation, energy transmission and distribution, energy and extractives, industry, trade and services, transportation, and rural and inter-urban roads.

=== IFC ===
As of 13 June 2019, the IFC has invested about US$1 billion in 50 projects in Vietnam and budgeted a total of US$20.2 million in advisory services to 16 projects. Since establishing its office in Vietnam in 1997, the IFC has worked to improve the private sector's access to finance, encourage structural reforms, promote international standards, and improve Vietnam's business climate.

==== Vietnamese Business Forum ====
In December 1997 in Tokyo, Japan, a Consultative Group Meeting was held between the Vietnamese government and its community of donors. The IFC suggested that there be dialogue between the government and private sector, which led to the establishment of the Vietnamese Business Forum (VBF). According to the VBF website, "the initiative was made in the context that government, donors, and foreign investors were looking for improvements to accelerate investment in Vietnam. Meanwhile, there had been numerous free-flowing unstructured meetings between the government leaders and individual foreign investors, leading contradictory recommendations."

With the guidance of the IFC, the VBF has saved an estimated $200 million for the private sector through "reforms that reduced barriers and increased transparency in business development processes". The VBF has continued efforts to ensure fair implementation of laws and to promote open and clear communications between the Vietnamese government and the private sector in all aspects of the Vietnamese economy. At the 2019 semiannual VBF, the chambers of multiple countries, such as the U.S. Chamber of Commerce (AmCham), Japanese Chamber of Commerce and Industry in Vietnam (JCCI), Korean Chamber of Business in Vietnam (KoCham), and British Business Group in Vietnam (BBGV), reported on and discussed a multitude of topics ranging from Vietnam's high levels of investment into infrastructural developments to large scale progress in renewable energy. In the closing statements by Ousmane Dione, the World Bank Country Director for Vietnam, it was noted there was a need for Vietnam be more adaptive and not just smarter or more conservative.

=== MIGA ===
As of 19 July 2019, the MIGA has guaranteed a total of US$907.4 million for three projects, collaborating with the IBRD and the IFC to enhance infrastructure, manufacturing development, and private sector growth in Vietnam. In 2013, MIGA guaranteed US$167.7 million of the loan supporting the expansion of the Masan Group's consumer products business; this, alongside the IFC's US$150 million investment, increased food security, boosted job creation, created significant tax revenues, and improved the development of local small and medium enterprises. On 7 March 2014, MIGA guaranteed US$500 million to cover the loan financing the BT20 National Highway 20 Project, which aimed to rehabilitate and upgrade the critical connector road for the Ho Chi Minh City–Da Lat corridor and was expected to boost the economic development of Vietnam's poorest areas. On 31 December 2015, MIGA guaranteed US$239 million for the Hoi Xuan Hydropower Project, which supported the development and improvement of renewable energy and energy infrastructure in Vietnam.

== Significant projects ==
=== Poverty reduction ===
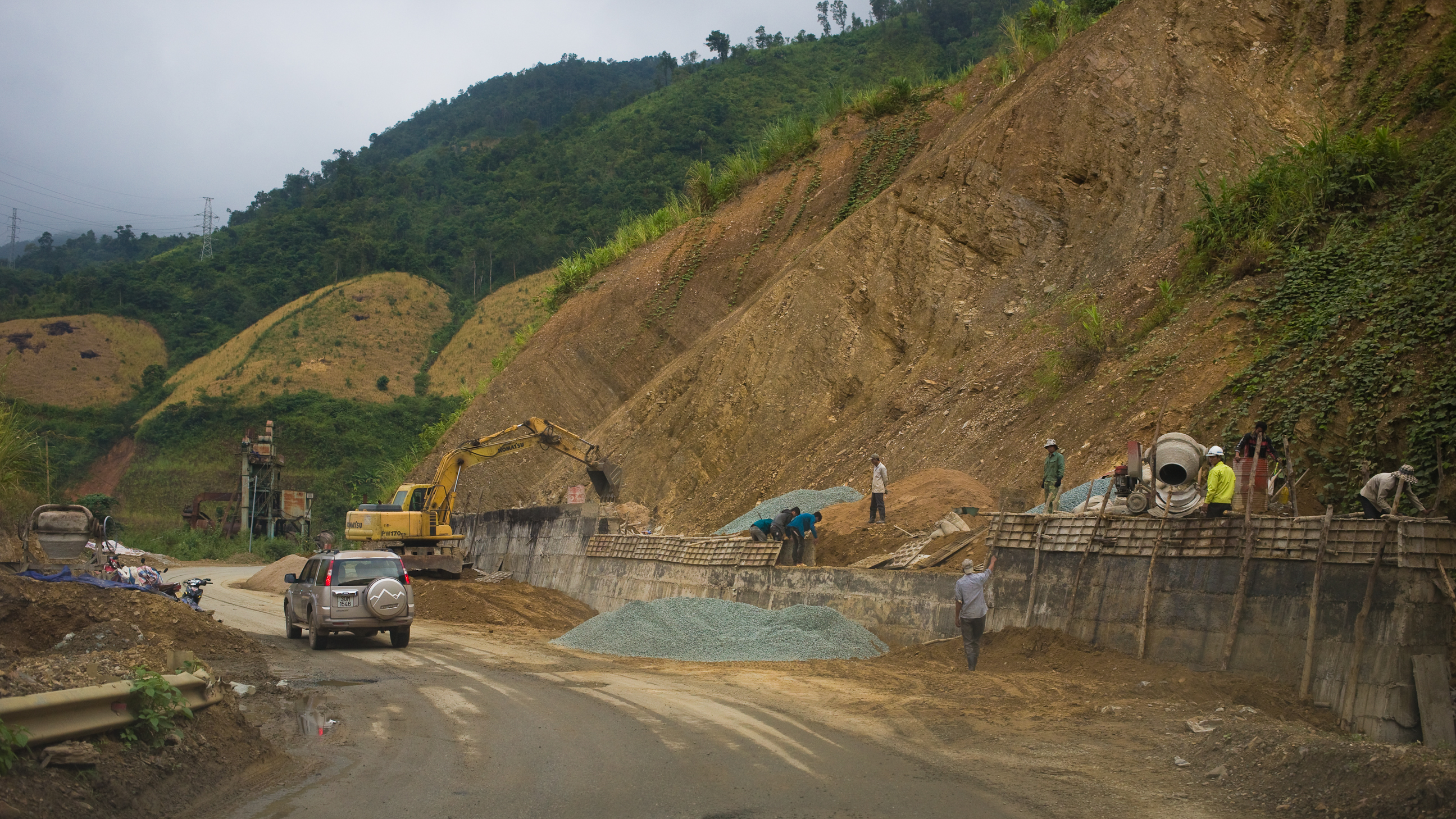
Rural roads in Lai Chau Province were improved.

A series of projects have been implemented to reduce poverty and improve living conditions in Vietnam. Launched in 2001, the First Northern Mountains Poverty Reduction Project aimed to improve infrastructure and rural services, covering broad sectors such as rural roads, irrigation systems, water supply, education, and health systems. The project, alongside the Second Project launched in 2010 with similar goals, resulted in a 15% increase in per-capita income among project beneficiaries in the poorest region of Vietnam.

Other projects, including ten Poverty Reduction Support Credit (PRSC) projects starting from 2001 and three Rural Financial Projects, also benefited rural private enterprises and households through improved access to finance. The percentage of people living under the national poverty line decreased from nearly 60% in 1993 to 13.5% in 2014. During the implementation of the PRSC projects, problems—including inadequate local knowledge and inefficient cooperation—delayed the project's operations and raised concerns about the program's quality; both the overall project and Vietnam's performance were rated unsatisfactory by the Project Performance Assessment Report.

=== Education ===
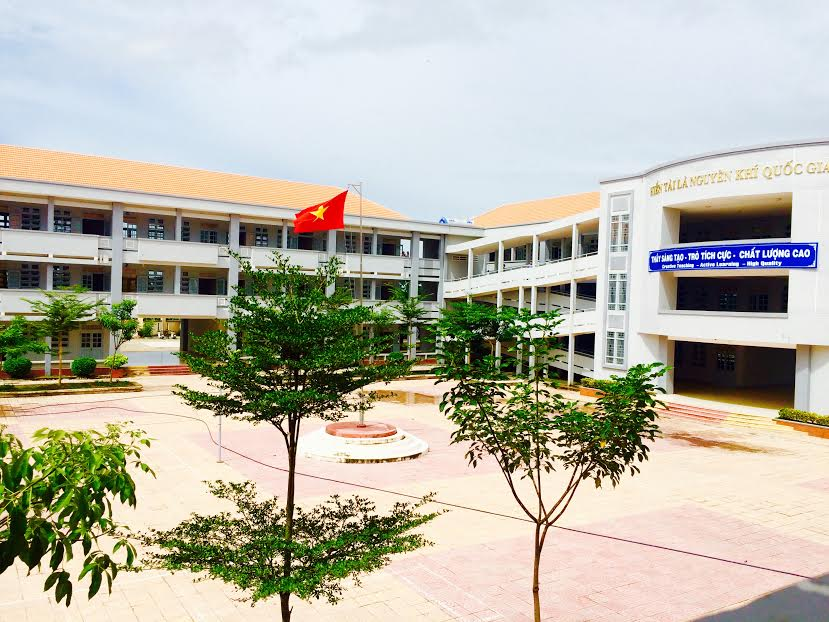
Brand-new buildings in the Nguyen Quang Dieu High School

The WB has funded numerous education projects that aimed to increase the accessibility, quality, and equality of education in Vietnam. In 1993, the first education project, the Primary Education Project, was launched in Vietnam. According to the WB, the project "provided more and better school books, built classrooms and improved school management in five rural provinces." It increased the enrollment rate (the rate of children attending school) from 86% in 1993 to 95% in 2002. From 2013 to 2017, the Vietnam School Readiness Promotion Project was launched to "raise school readiness" for 5-year-old children. The project raised the enrollment rate of preschool children from 73.7% in 2012 to 87.6% in 2017. From 2009 to 2014, three projects under the Higher Education Development Policy Program supported and implemented a higher-education reform to improve quality, accountability, and transparency in education.

=== Infrastructure and rural services ===
Out of over 200 WB-supported projects, 53 projects were related to "rural services and infrastructure", the most of any area. According to the IEG, the Third Rural Transport Project (2006–2014) aimed to "reduce travel costs and improve access" in rural areas through rehabilitating and maintaining rural roads. People living within 2 kilometers (1.2 mi) of an all-weather road increased from 76% in 2011 to 87% in 2014. (Note: According to the official IEG report, "People living within 2 km of an all-weather road increased from 76% at appraisal to 87% at project closure". Project appraisal occurred on 31 December 2011. Project closure occurred on 30 June 2014.) The Red River Delta Rural Water Supply and Sanitation Project aimed to establish and improve water supply and sanitation infrastructure. The project was expected to benefit 800,000 people living in four provinces in the Red River Delta. Implemented from 2004 to 2014, the Vietnam Urban Upgrading Project aimed to improve infrastructure for 7.5 million urban residents, through improving homes, roads, canals, and bridges.

=== Energy ===
Since 2000, Vietnam's annual GDP growth rate has been between 5% and 7.6%. The country's energy demand and consumption have grown in accordance. On 26 April 2011, the WB approved the Trung Son Hydropower Project, which aimed to generate renewable energy in the form of hydroelectricity. With a loan of $330 million from the IBRD, the Trung Son Hydropower Company constructed the dam while the WB provided facilitation and technical support. By 31 July 2017, the project had generated an accumulated energy output of 955 GWh (3,440 terajoules) and US$37 million in revenue. Previous projects, such as the Second Rural Energy Project from 2004 to 2014, have also benefited households in rural areas through providing more electricity and increasing accessibility.

== Future goals and strategy shifts ==
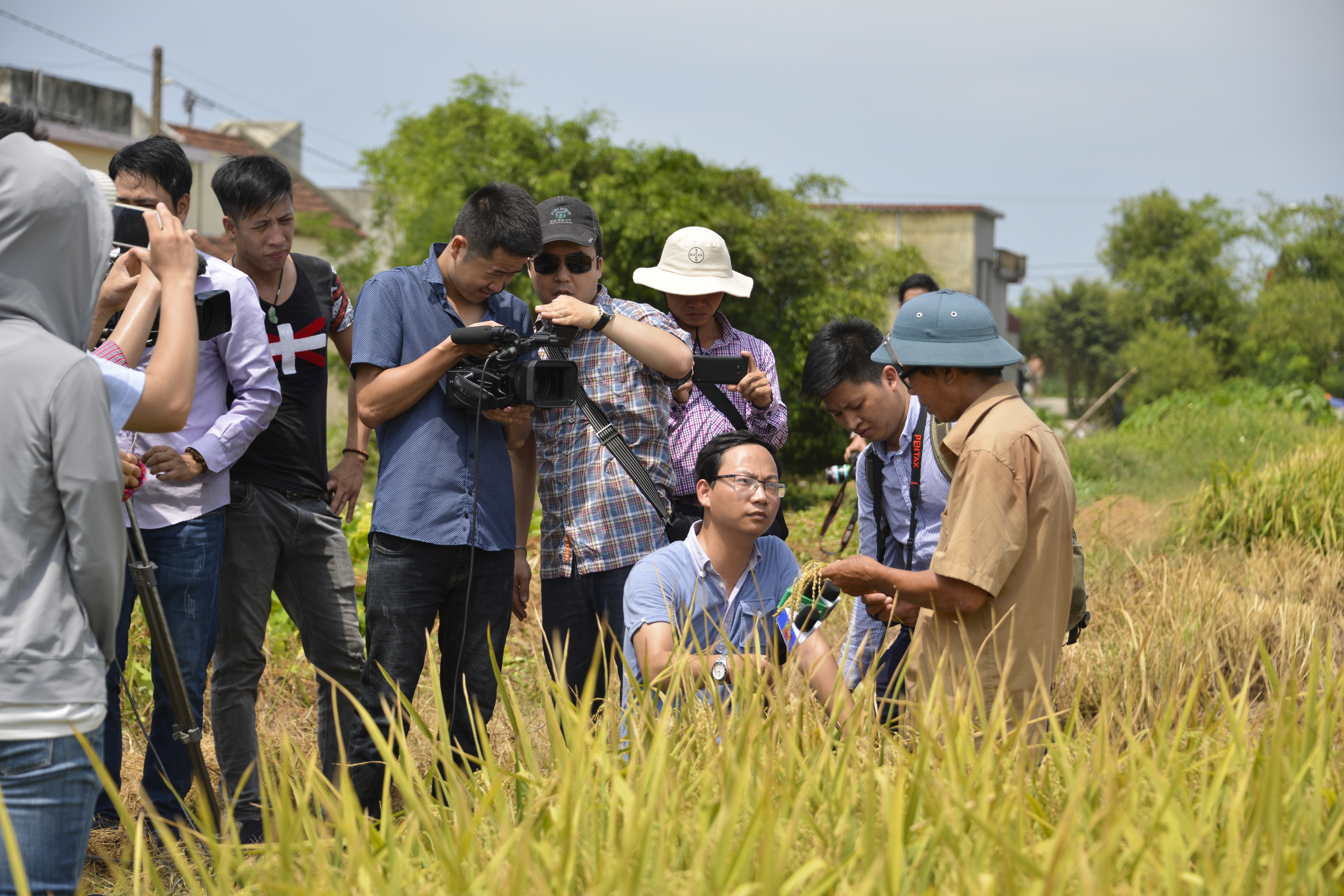
In agricultural development, there is an increased focus on environmental protection and climate change.

=== Country Partnership Framework ===
The new Country Partnership Framework (CPF)—for Vietnam from 2018 to 2022—was endorsed by the WBG's Board of Executive Directors on 5 May 2017. In the partnership, Vietnam and the WBG are prioritizing "inclusive growth, investment in people, environmental sustainability and good governance". The CPF was "based on analysis in the Vietnam 2035: Toward Prosperity, Creativity, Equity, and Democracy and the 2016 Vietnam Systematic Country Diagnostic" and introduced several strategic shifts, including strengthening private sector development, supporting financial sustainability and poverty reduction, improving education, and promoting low carbon energy generation.

The WB planned to further promote private sector development, support public services and transfers, reduce poverty among ethnic minorities, reconcile the education and labor markets, and encourage more low-carbon energy generation.

=== Vietnam 2035: Toward Prosperity, Creativity, Equity, and Democracy ===
Experts from the WB and Vietnam have made joint efforts to construct a blueprint for the country's future development, which were expressed in Vietnam 2035: Toward Prosperity, Creativity, Equity, and Democracy. According to the report, Vietnam plans to complete its transition into a modern, industrialized country by 2035. Three pillars were proposed to achieve the goal: "Economic Prosperity with Environmental Sustainability", "Equity and Social Inclusion", and "A Capable and Accountable State".

== Controversies ==
While the WB has made significant commitments to Vietnam, the extent of the WB's contributions to Vietnam's development has been debated. Although the WB presented Vietnam as the successful model of its market-oriented policies, critics have argued that the role of the WB in fostering Vietnam's reforms was exaggerated because the reforms were more internal than external. In the 1990s, the WB made several proposals for structural adjustments in Vietnam. However, the Vietnamese government refused to adopt these proposals, and it has since been reluctant to liberalize trade, leading some scholars to conclude that the WB had limited influence on Vietnam's development.
