= Agriculture in Vietnam =

Development of agricultural output of Vietnam in 2015 US$ since 1961

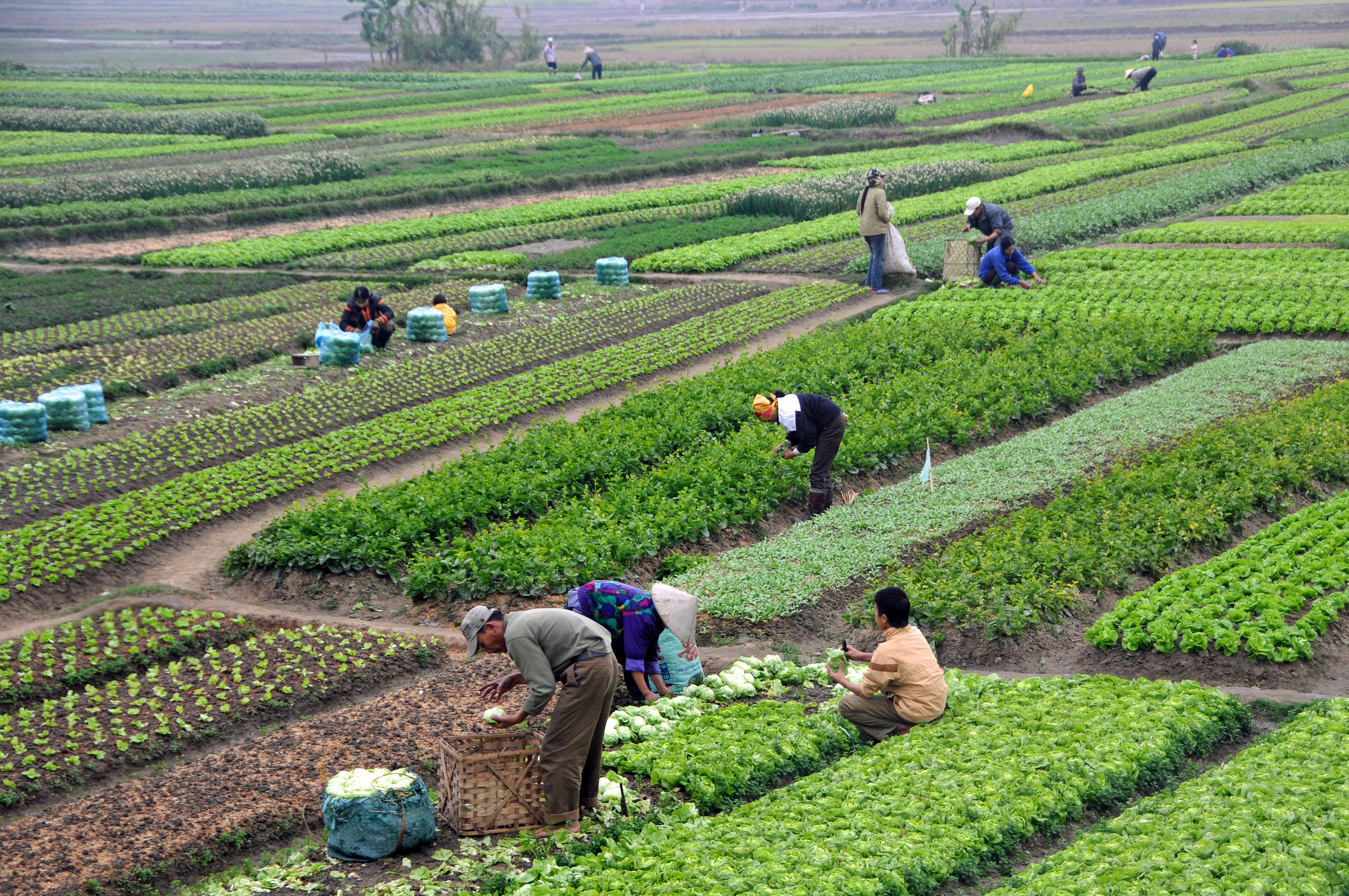
Agriculture in Vietnam with farmers.

Agriculture's share of GDP has declined in recent years, falling from 42% in 1989, to 26% in 1999. In 2023, agriculture and forestry accounted for about 12% of Vietnam's gross domestic product (GDP). However, agricultural employment was much higher than agriculture's share of GDP; in 2005, approximately 60 percent of the employed labor force was engaged in agriculture, forestry, and fishing. Agricultural products accounted for 30 percent of exports in 2005. The relaxation of the state monopoly on rice exports transformed the country into the world's second or third largest rice exporter. Other cash crops are coffee, cotton, peanuts, rubber, sugarcane, and tea.

Agricultural cooperatives have played an important role in Vietnam's rural areas. Reforms have aimed to strengthen the roles of the coops, from providing services such as irrigation, to investment platforms and sustainable farming practices

== History ==
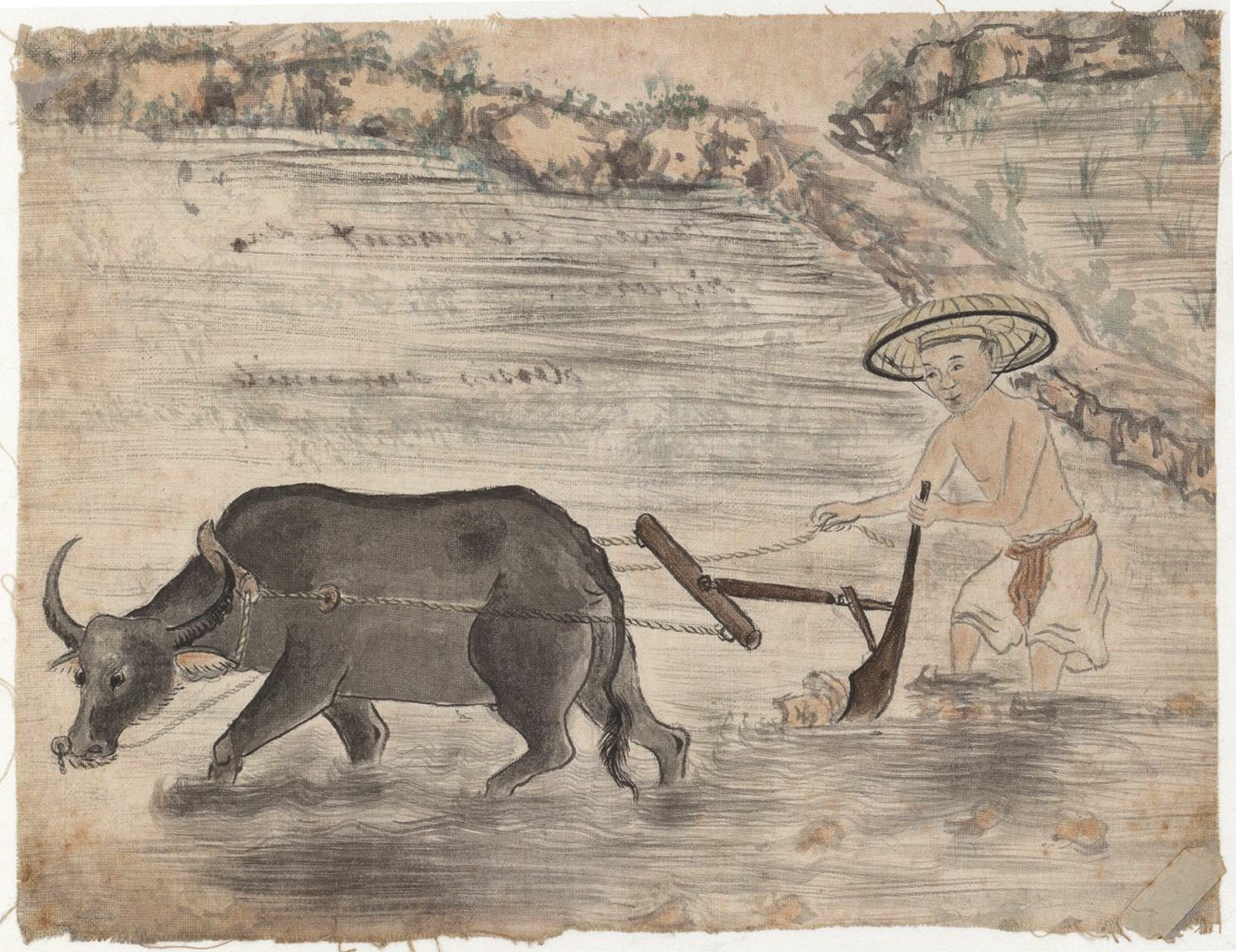
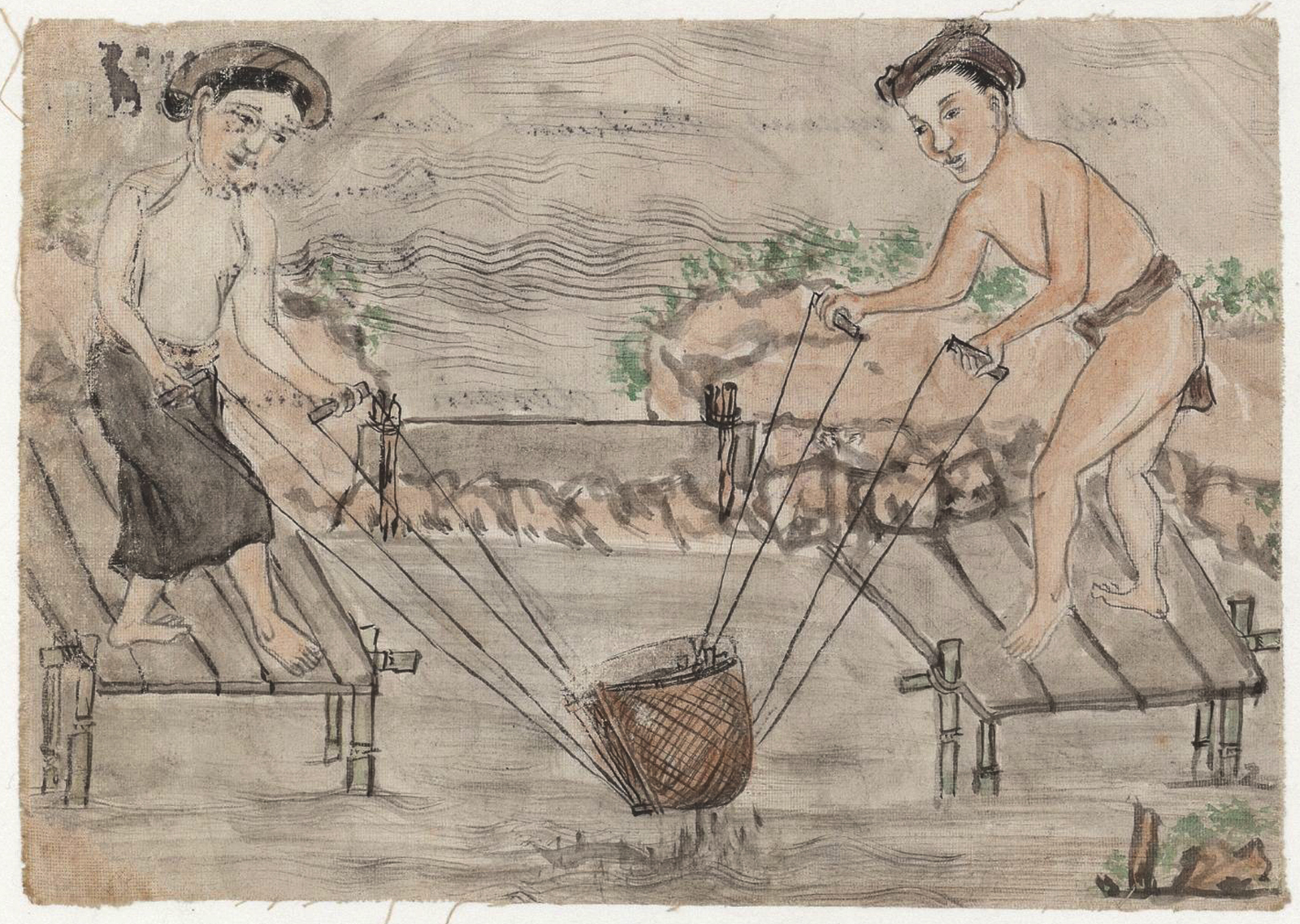
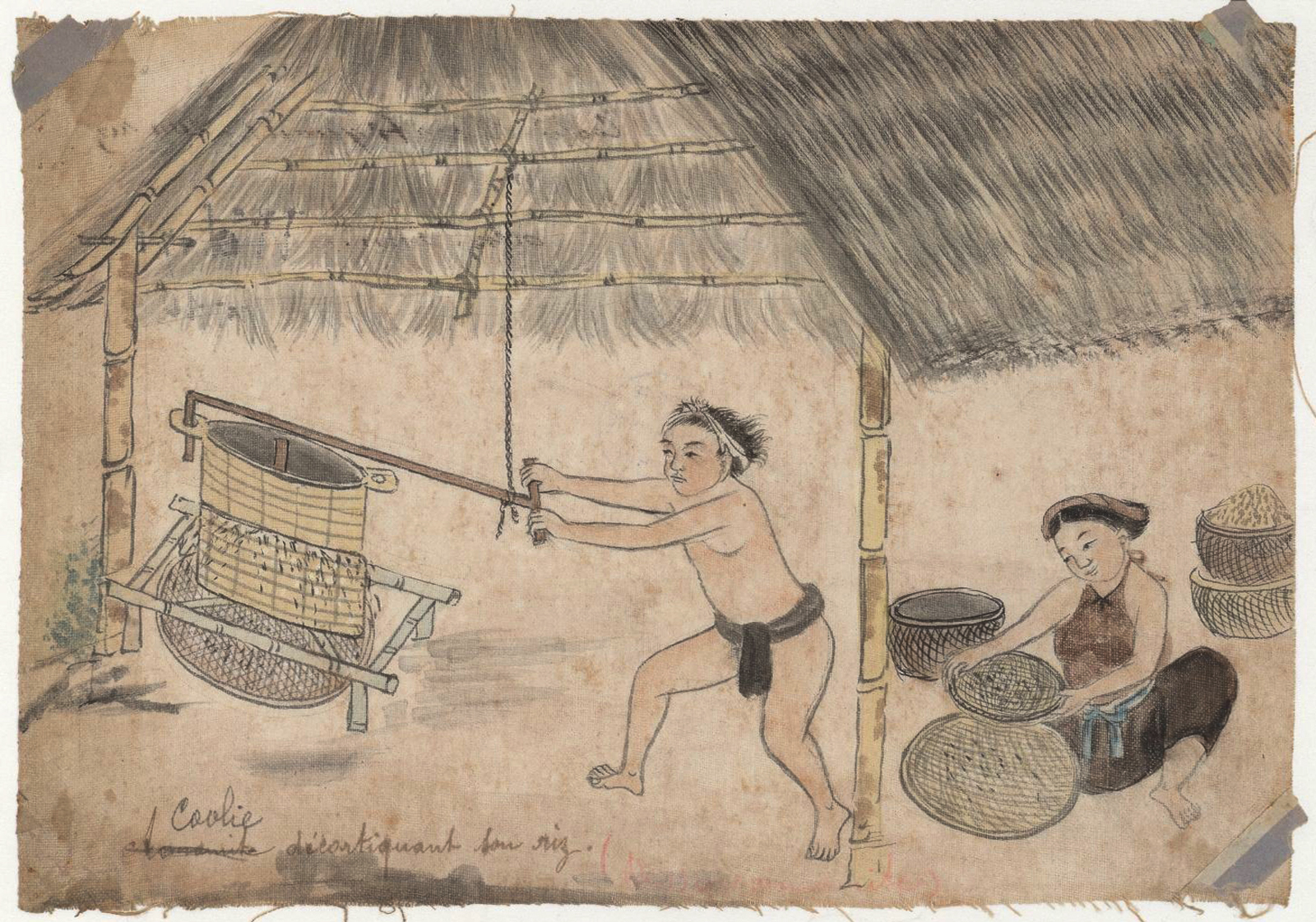
Agricultural production in Vietnam in 1923.

=== Government programs and results in the 1970s ===
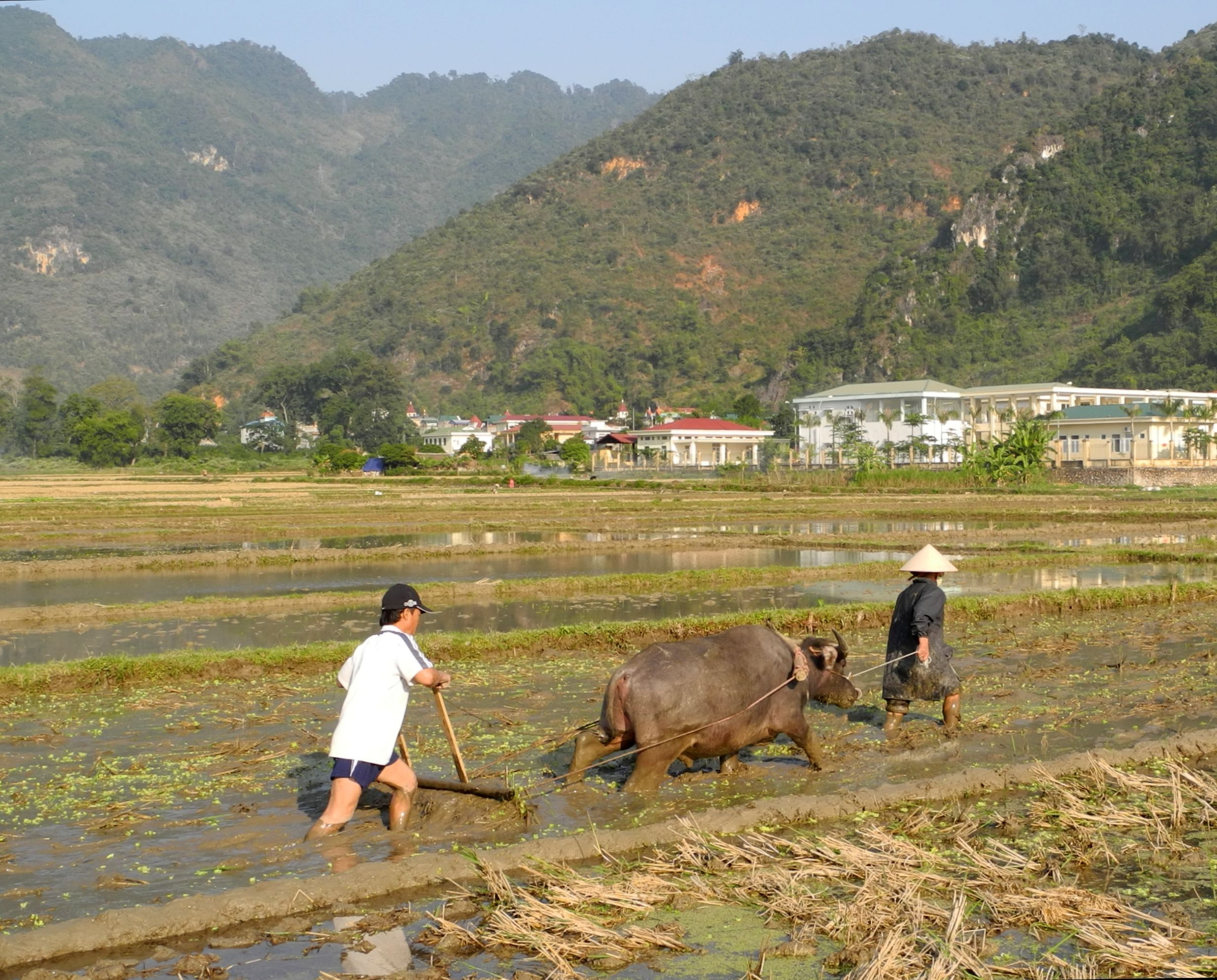
Rice tillage in Mai Châu. Farmers use the traditional farming method with buffalos.

Agricultural production, the backbone of Vietnam's main development strategy, varied considerably from year to year following the national reunification in 1975. A particularly strong performance in agriculture was recorded in 1976—up more than 10 percent from 1975. However, production dropped back to approximately 95 percent of the 1976 level in 1977 and 1978, and recovered to a level higher than that of 1976 only in 1979.

Vietnamese crop and livestock production offset agricultural performance during this period. For example, an 8-percent increase in the value of livestock production in 1977 balanced an 8-percent decrease in the value of crop production (mainly the result of a 1-million-ton decline in the rice harvest). In 1978 the reverse occurred; a steep decline in livestock output countered a significant increase in grain production. The value of crop production, however, averaged four times the value of livestock output at this time.

Foremost among Vietnam's agricultural troubles was exceptionally adverse weather, including a drought in 1977 and major typhoons and widespread flooding in 1978. The drought overtaxed Vietnam's modest irrigation systems which were also damaged in the floods. In addition, the floods reportedly reduced herds of cattle by 20 percent. The size of this loss was indirectly confirmed in Vietnamese statistics that showed a levelling off of growth in livestock inventories (particularly of cattle) between 1978 and 1980. Throughout the Second Five-Year Plan, and especially in the late 1970s, chemical fertilizers, pesticides, and parts for agricultural machinery were in short supply.

Despite this, the severe reversals in the agricultural sector fairly early in the plan period, for the most part, greatly diminished hopes of achieving self-sufficiency in food production by 1980. The 1980 grain target eventually was lowered from 21 million tons to 15 million tons, but even that amount proved unattainable.

The agricultural policies promulgated from 1976 through 1980 had mixed results. Pragmatic measures that encouraged the planting of more subsidiary food crops (such as sweet potatoes, manioc, beans, and corn) led to an increase of these crops from a level of less than 10 percent in 1975 to a level that was more than 20 percent of grain output by the late 1970s. Improved incentives for farmers in 1978 and 1979 included efforts to boost availability of consumer goods in the countryside and to raise state procurement prices. They were reinforced by adoption of a contract system that sought to guarantee producers access to agricultural inputs in exchange for farm products. Even so, bureaucratic inefficiencies and shortages of agricultural supplies prevented complete success.

The program undertaken in mid-1977 to expedite unification of North and South by collectivizing Southern agriculture was met with strong resistance. The reportedly voluntary program was designed to be implemented by local leaders, but Southern peasants were mainly freeholders—not tenants. Aside from forming production teams for mutual assistance (an idea that won immediate acceptance), they resisted participation in any collective program that attenuated property rights.

Failure to collectivize agriculture by voluntary means led briefly to the adoption of coercive measures to increase peasant participation. It soon became apparent, however, that such harsh methods were counterproductive. Increased food shortages and heightened security concerns in late 1978 and 1979 caused the leadership once again to relax its grip on Southern agriculture.

=== North Vietnam ===
In the North, formation of cooperatives had begun in 1959 and 1960, and by 1965 about 90 percent of peasant households were organized into collectives. By 1975 more than 96 percent of peasant households belonging to cooperatives were classified as members of "high-level cooperatives," which meant that farmers had contributed land, tools, animals, and labor in exchange for income.

Between 1976 and 1980, agricultural policy in the North was implemented by newly established government district offices in an effort to improve central control over planting decisions and farm work. The lax enforcement of state agricultural policies adopted during the war years gave way to a greater rigidity that diminished cooperative members' flexibility to undertake different tasks. Labor productivity fell as a result. A study by an overseas Vietnamese who surveyed ten rice-growing cooperatives found that, despite an increase in labor and area cultivated in 1975, 1976, and 1977, production decreased while costs increased when compared with production and costs for 1972 through 1974. Although the study failed to take weather and other variables into account, the findings were consistent with conclusions reached by investigators who have studied the effects of collectivization in other countries. Moreover, the study drew attention to the North's poor agricultural performance as a reason for Vietnam's persistent food problem.

State investment in agriculture under the Third Five-Year Plan remained low, and the sector was severely troubled throughout the plan period and into 1986 and 1987 as well. Only modest food-grain increases of 5 percent were generated annually. Although this was enough to outpace the 2.3 percent annual rate of population growth during the 1980s, it remained insufficient to raise average annual per capita food consumption much above the official subsistence level of 300 kilograms. One official Vietnamese source estimated in 1986 that farm families devoted up to 80 percent of their income to their own food needs.

At the conclusion of the Third Five-Year Plan, agricultural yields remained less than required to permit diverting resources to the support of industrial development. In 1986 agriculture still accounted for about 44 percent of national income (the figure for developed nations is closer to 10 percent). The agricultural sector also occupied some 66 percent of the work force—a higher percentage than in 1976 and 1980. Worse still, the output per agricultural worker had slipped during the plan period, falling even farther behind the increasing output per worker in industry. In 1980 more than three agricultural workers were needed to produce as much national income as a single industrial or construction worker. By 1985 an industrial worker produced more than six times as much as an agricultural worker.

=== After 1986 ===
In December 1986, Võ Văn Kiệt, vice chairman of the Council of Ministers and member of the Political Bureau, highlighted most of the major problems of Vietnamese agriculture in his speech to the Twelfth Session of the Seventh National Assembly. While mentioning gains in fisheries and forestry, he noted that nearly all farming subsectors—constituting 80 percent of the agricultural sector-had failed to achieve plan targets for 1986. Kiet blamed state agencies, such as the Council of Ministers, the State Planning Commission, and the Ministry of Foreign Trade, for their failure to ensure appropriate "material conditions" (chiefly sufficient quantities of chemical fertilizers and pesticides) for the growth of agricultural production. Kiet also blamed the state price system for underproduction of key "industrial crops" that Vietnam exported, including jute, sugar, groundnut, coffee, tea, and rubber. Production levels of subsidiary food crops, such as sweet potatoes, corn, and manioc, had been declining for several years, both in relation to plan targets and in actual output as well. By contrast, livestock output, including that of cattle, poultry, buffalo, and hogs, was reported by the government to have continued its growth and to have met or exceeded targets, despite unstable prices and shortages of state-provided animal feed.

Outside observers agreed that the problems noted in Kiet's speech had been exacerbated by the complexity of the pricing system, which included multiple tiers of fixed prices for quota and above-quota state purchases as well as generally higher free market prices. The removal of more orthodox leaders, the rise of moderate reformists such as Kiet to high party and government positions during the Sixth National Party Congress, and the cabinet changes in early 1987 seemed to indicate that the pricing system would be modified, although no change was evident in the fundamental structure of state-controlled markets or in the tension within the multiple-market system.

On 5 April 1988, General Secretary Nguyễn Văn Linh issued Resolution No. 10-NQ/TW (Khoán 10) regarding agricultural economic management. Khoán 10 recognized households as autonomous economic units and provided for farmers to have parcels, land-use rights, and long term contracts. Khoán 10 then became the basis for other regulations governing long-term, stable land use for farmers, including the 1993 land law.

In 1989, compulsory agricultural procurement quotas were abolished.

== Production and trade ==
Vietnam's ranking in agricultural productions (data in 2016)
Product name	Global rank
Black peppercorn	1
Cashew nuts	1
Coffee	2
Coconut	6
Rice, paddy	5
Rubber	3
Sweet potatoes	10
Tea	6

In Vietnam, agriculture, forestry and fisheries, are important sectors of the economy, accounting for 21 percent of GDP in 2009. Vietnam possesses certain comparative advantages in agriculture and forestry due to the country's abundance of factors in favor of productive crop like cultivation land, forest cover, sea territories, tropical climate and labor (availability and cost).

In 1986, the Vietnamese government's agricultural policy has changed from a centrally planning and autarkic system to an open and market-oriented one. In the reform package, the most important components are land reform, trade reform, and the development of policy instruments to assist agricultural production in general. The trade of agricultural products has been liberalized internally and externally. Since then, Vietnam changed dramatically from a country heavily affected by hunger after the war to become one of the largest food exporters in the world.

At the beginning of the 1980s, Vietnam turned from an importer to a net exporter of agricultural products. Due to the trade liberalization and agricultural reforms in Vietnam, the value of exports in the agricultural sector increased manifold with the main export commodities being rice, coffee, pepper and cashew nut, but also rubber, tea, groundnut, soybean, fruit and vegetables, and pork.

Vietnam produced, in 2018:

- 44.0 million tons of rice (5th largest producer in the world, behind China, India, Indonesia and Bangladesh);
- 17.9 million tons of sugar cane (16th largest producer in the world);
- 14.8 million tons of vegetable;
- 9.8 million tons of cassava (7th largest producer in the world);
- 4.8 million tons of maize;
- 2.6 million tonnes of cashew nut (largest producer in the world), Blood cashews human rights report;
- 2.0 million tons of banana (20th largest producer in the world);
- 1.6 million tons of coffee (2nd largest producer in the world, only behind Brazil);
- 1.5 million tons of coconut (6th largest producer in the world);
- 1.3 million tons of sweet potato (9th largest producer in the world);
- 1.2 million tons of watermelon;
- 1.1 million tons of natural rubber (3rd largest producer in the world, behind Thailand and Indonesia);
- 852 thousand tons of orange (18th largest producer in the world);
- 779 thousand tons of mango (including mangosteen and guava);
- 654 thousand tons of pineapple (12th largest producer in the world);
- 270 thousand tons of tea (6th largest producer in the world);

In addition to smaller productions of other agricultural products.

== See also ==
- Irrigation in Vietnam

== Resources ==
- Improving resource allocation and incomes in Vietnamese agriculture:A case study of farming in the Dong Nai River Basin, an International Food Policy Research Institute (IFPRI) discussion paper.
- Vietnam Gardening and Agriculture
