= Foreign aid to Vietnam =

Overview of aid

The World Bank’s assistance program of foreign aid to Vietnam has three objectives: to support Vietnam's transition to a market economy, to enhance equitable and sustainable development, and to promote good governance. From 1993 through 2004, Vietnam received pledges of US$29 billion of Official Development Assistance (ODA), of which about US$14 billion, or 49 percent, has been disbursed. In 2004 international donors pledged ODA of US$2.25 billion, of which US$1.65 billion was disbursed. Three donors accounted for 80 percent of disbursements in 2004: Japan, the World Bank, and the Asian Development Bank. During the period 2006–10, Vietnam hopes to receive US$14 billion–US$15 billion of ODA.

== History ==
In the late 1970s, Vietnam relied on the assistance of West German, Italian, and Canadian companies for offshore oil exploration. This ended in 1981, but resumed subsequently with Soviet technical assistance. Aid from China, reportedly close to US$300 million in 1977 and 1978, dropped to zero in 1979, and Vietnamese recovery in coal production was profoundly affected by the accompanying loss of ethnic Chinese workers. In 1979 Japan suspended its Official Development Assistance funds (a mixture of grants and low-interest loans amounting to US$135 million) and made renewal contingent upon Vietnamese withdrawal from Cambodia. Loss of other Western aid in hard currencies crippled Vietnam's ability to continue importing needed modern machinery and technology from its West European trading partners. Following Vietnam's occupation of Cambodia, only Sweden continued to provide any significant amount of economic help. Some multilateral assistance, such as that for development of the Mekong River, was made available by the United Nations Economic and Social Commission for Asia and the Pacific, however. Western and multilateral assistance, therefore, did not stop entirely, although the yearly average of about US$100 million through 1986 provided only a fraction of the country's hard-currency needs. In 1986 Vietnam's current account deficit with major industrial countries was some US$221 million. The conflicts with Cambodia and China in 1978 and 1979 proved particularly costly in terms of continuing economic ties with Western and neighboring Asian countries. As a result, Hanoi was forced to rely even more heavily on Soviet-bloc assistance.

The Soviet Union and other members of Comecon increased their aid commitments as their own planning became more closely coordinated with Vietnam's following Hanoi's entry into Comecon in June 1978. Soviet economic aid in 1978, estimated at between US$0.7 and 1.0 billion, was already higher than Western assistance. By 1982 it had increased to more than US$1 billion annually, close to US$3 million per day, and it remained at this level through the mid-1980s. The Soviet Union and other Comecon countries provided aid in all categories—project assistance, technical training, price subsidies, loans, and trade credits. Soviet publications emphasized the importance of project assistance to Vietnam's economic recovery, but about 75 percent of the value of aid disbursed during the Third Five-Year Plan was used to finance Vietnam's bilateral trade deficit with the Soviet Union, which averaged about US$896 million a year. Trade subsidies in the form of reduced prices for Soviet oil also declined sharply in the early 1980s as the Soviet Union brought Vietnam into the Comecon oil-pricing system based on world market values.

Although the details of Comecon assistance to Vietnam since the 1970s had not been made public as of late 1987, Soviet sources gave some indications of the type of project assistance provided and were quick to claim credit for production increases attributable to Soviet technical and plant assistance. Soviet-aid goals from 1978 to 1981 included helping with balance-of-payments problems, assisting with key projects, introducing industrial cooperation, accelerating scientific and technical cooperation, and assisting with the improvement of Vietnamese professional skills. During this period, the Soviet Union also signed numerous agreements calling for financial and technical assistance in matters ranging from traffic-improvement programs for the railroad from Hanoi to Ho Chi Minh City to completing construction of the Thang Long Bridge over the Red River.

== See also ==
- Vietnam and the World Bank
- Foreign relations of Vietnam
