= Poverty in Vietnam =

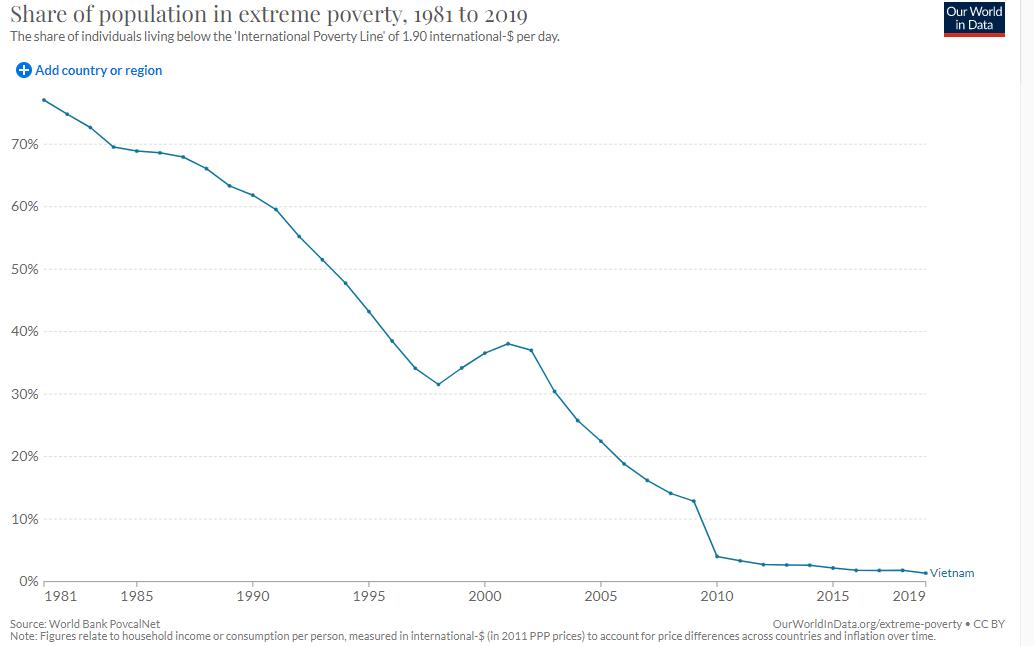
Share of population in extreme poverty over time

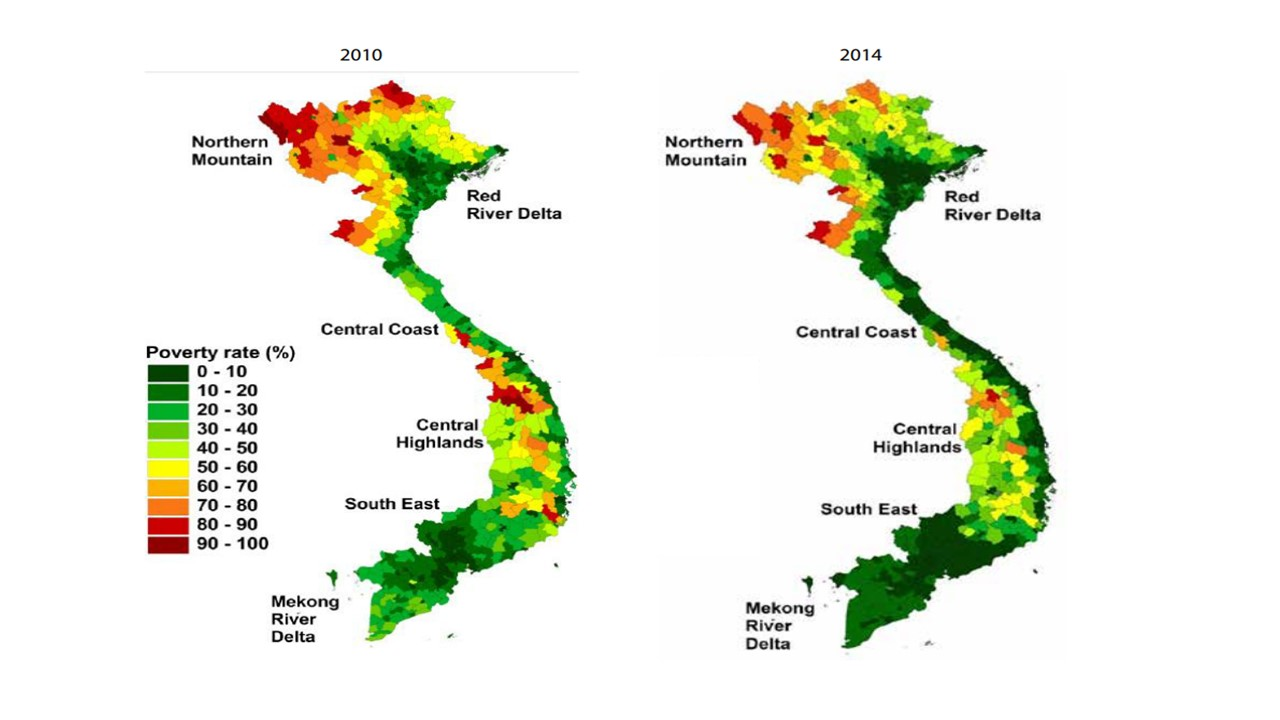
Map poverty rates by district of Viet Nam in 2010 and 2014.

Until the 1990s, most of the Vietnamese population lived under the poverty line. This was due to a number of reasons, which was a result from years as a French colony, the Japanese occupation of Vietnam, the Vietnam-American War, and further conflicts within Mainland Southeast Asia (primarily the Cambodian-Vietnamese war and the Sino-Vietnamese War). Continuous conflicts from 1887 to 1991, more than 100 years of instability had left Vietnam a war-torn country that was prone to severe floods from typhoons, rising sea levels, as well as the so-called "flood season" from seasonal monsoons (East Asian monsoon in winter and South Asian monsoon in summer), as well as the effects of climate change.

Political and economic reform that started in 1986, which was a set of policies for market liberalization labelled Đổi Mới (Renovation/Innovation), the status of poverty and hunger in Vietnam has been significantly improved - from one of the poorest countries in the world with per capita income below US$100 per year, by the end of 2013 Vietnam became a middle income country with per capita income of US$1,910 (in 2013). The poverty rate decreased from 58 percent in 1993 to 28.9 percent in 2002, 14.5 percent in 2008, to about 12 percent in 2011. About 28 million people are estimated to have been lifted out of poverty over two decades. The 2014 Global Hunger Index (GHI) Report ranked Vietnam 15th amongst 81 nations suffering from hunger, with a GHI of 7.5 compared with an alarming 27.7 in 1990. (A country with GHI ≥ 30 is considered to have an extremely alarming hunger situation; GHI between 20.0 and 29.9 is alarming; and GHI between 10.0 and 19.9 is a serious hunger situation.) Achievements in poverty reduction and hunger eradication have been highly appreciated and successful in furthering economic development. However, Vietnam still has many tasks ahead in fighting against poverty and hunger at large as well as for more vulnerable groups of people such as ethnic minorities, disabled people, caring for the elderly, and those vulnerable to crime.

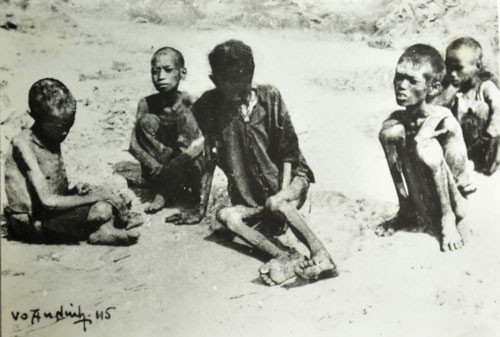
Famine in Vietnam, 1945

In terms of education, besides primary school and secondary school which most Vietnamese complete, high school completion rates in early 2021 in the second year of the coronavirus pandemic was only an abysmal 58%, which was nevertheless, was up from just 55% in 2013. From 1990 to 2016, Vietnam's gross enrollment ratio in tertiary education grew from only 2.7% to 28.3%. Nevertheless, the ratio remains well below that of other countries in the region. Specific regions of Vietnam where there are heavy imbalances of education attainment and wealth dragged the average down.

Based on a report from the Asian Development Bank, Vietnam has a total population of 91.70 million as of 2015, about one million people more compared to the previous year. In 2016, 5.8% of the population lived below the national poverty line; in 2019, the unemployment rate was 2.0%. The percentage of people living in slums dropped from 60.5% in 1992 to 13.8% living in slums by 2018.

Furthermore, the climate of Vietnam is heavily prone to floods from a number of sources: typhoons; seasonal monsoons, with the South Asian monsoon in the summer, and the East Asian monsoon in the winter; and rising sea levels as a consequence of climate change. Although the 21st Century for Vietnam so far has been remained relatively conflict-free military wise, challenges remain nonetheless.

== Poverty and demographics ==
There are a wide range of causes of poverty, however poverty derives mostly from demographic elements:

- The majority of the poor are farmers. In 1998 almost 80 percent of the poor worked in agriculture.
- The majority of the poor live in rural, isolated, mountainous or disaster prone areas, where physical infrastructure and public service are relatively undeveloped.
- The poor often lack production means and cultivated land.
- They have limited access to the state credit and often access through back credit with very high interest.
- The households often have many children but few laborers.
- The poor are disproportionately likely to be from an ethnic minority. The percentage of households with heads coming from ethnic minorities increased from 17,8 percent in 1993 to 40,7 percent in 2008.
- The poor have limited education: people who have not completed primary education account for the highest rate of poverty.
- Rural households consisting of only women and children are particularly vulnerable to poverty because the number of dependents is relatively high compared with the available labor force.
- Slums are also very detrimental to people in general who live in falling apart or old and decrepit infrastructure due to lack of sanitation, proper electricity and water services, unregulated law enforcement, ugly conditions etc. Other factors include increased crime rates, overcrowded living in tiny spaces, as well as being caught in limbo in governmental development of particular areas.
- Caring for the elderly is seen in Vietnam as a family affair and elderly care via nursing homes is a relatively unfamiliar and new practice to the Vietnamese. Whilst the family has to take care of the elderly due to practices of filial piety, resources and mental toll is expended by the family to take care of their own elderly, which can lead to poorer conditions and in the future, the potential need for elderly care services.
- Expenses for national integrity and defense.

Such instances of poverty as well as neglect of school can lead people to become more exposed and vulnerable to crime such as human trafficking, corruption, drug trafficking, etc.

== Provision on poverty line ==
=== Poverty line applied for the period 2005 – 2010 ===
Based on the state of the socio–economic development, the government promulgates the poverty line for each stage. The ordinance of the poverty line applied for the period 2005 – 2010 provided that:

- In the rural area, households with average income under the Vietnamese đồng (VND) 2,400,000 per capita per year (equivalent US$150 ) are regarded as poor households.
- In the urban area, households with average income under VND 3,120,000 per capita per year (equivalent US$195 ) are regarded as poor households.

=== Poverty line applied for the period 2011 – 2015 ===
The ordinance of the poverty line applied for the period of 2011 – 2015 provided that:

- The poor households in rural areas are households with average income under VND 400,000 per capita per month or VND 4,800,000 per capita per year (roughly US$19 per capita per month).
- The poor households in urban areas are households with average income under VND 500,000 per capita per month or VND 6,000,000 per capita per year (roughly US$24 per capita per month).
- The pro-poor households in rural areas are households with average income from VND 401,000 to VND 520,000 per capita per month (roughly US$19–25 per capita per month).
- The pro-poor households in urban areas are households with average income from VND 501,000 to VND 650,000 per capita per month (roughly US$24–31 per capita per month).

With the new poverty line, Vietnam's percentage of households was estimated to be 12 percent at the end of 2011.

== Poverty reduction ==
Some achievements regarding poverty reduction in Vietnam are summarized below:

=== Economic growth ===
Maintaining economic growth is essential to underpin further reductions in poverty. Sustainable growth is the pre-condition to create employment, improve income and create resources needed to implement well-being and social-safety programs. The high economic growth from 2000 to 2010 from the base of a very poor economy was regarded as a substantial cause of reducing poverty and eradicating hunger.

=== Governmental programs ===
The high political determination and commitment of the government in fighting against poverty and hunger as well as its citizens and Vietnamese abroad has played a critical role. In the last two decades, many policies have been promulgated with huge governmental funds. Re-emittances by overseas Vietnamese back to Vietnam also number in billions of dollars. The most prominent program is the socio-economic development program for the most vulnerable communes in ethnic minority and mountainous areas, also shortly referred to as the 135 program. The program's target is to:

- Promote production and increase the living standard for ethnic minority households;
- Develop infrastructure and develop essential public services in the localities such as electricity, schools, health clinics, small irrigation systems, roads, clean water providing systems;
- Enhance the people's awareness for better living standards and quality of life.

In its phase I (1998 – 2005), the program invested VND 9142 billion (US$571 million) from the governmental fund for 1870 extremely difficult communes. The program's phase II (2006 – 2010) continued to cover 1879 communes with a total budget of US$1 billion.

=== Assistance from international community ===
As a previously underdeveloped country, Vietnam prioritized receiving Official Development Assistance (ODA) from international organizations and developed countries such as the World Bank, the Asian Development Bank, the United Nations and the European Commission. Over the last decades, these organizations have provided millions of dollars to invest in infrastructure, human resource development, and public administration reform. For example, in the period of 1993–2001 a total of US$17.5 billion was pledged to the Government of Vietnam, with annual pledges remaining at a constant level in the order of US$2.2 billion each year. From this amount, the total value of signed ODA is around US$14 billion, with actual disbursements estimated to be US$9 billion.

=== Collaboration between parties ===
Reduction in poverty is only successful if all parties from the government to civil society and donors, from central to local government and people themselves are involved in the process. However, it is essential that the roles and responsibilities of the various stakeholders are assigned clearly and specifically. Greater clarity of their roles will result in a more effective and greater coherence between them. The Vietnam Development Report (2001) suggests a way of addressing this by making a clear division of responsibility between central and local government, the role of poverty reduction staff at local levels, and of related stakeholders, for the management and delivery of poverty reduction activities.

=== The social protection system ===
The social protection system plays an essential role for sustainable poverty reduction. In Vietnam, the current social protection system consist of three main components which are social security, social assistance and area-based programs. The social security includes social insurance, health insurance and unemployment insurance. The social assistance targets beneficiaries including the elderly aged 85 and over or living alone, the disabled, mentally-disabled patients, single parents, orphans and others, whereas the area-based program is to be spent on emergency relief to provide aid to natural disaster victims. A side effect however of increasing socio-economics also leads to increasing social pressures. Suicide rates in Vietnam have increased over the past decades (2000-2021), with men being more likely to be recipients of suicidal deaths then women. Suicide rates have had this gender imbalance across a majority of countries or nations or peoples. As such, a social protection system (tư-vấn tâm-lý, psychological-counselling in Vietnamese) for those at risk of suicide (tự tử or tự sát) is important, with more research and study in regards to suicidal prevention for Vietnamese required. At the same time, more research and studies are required to resolve issues of sexual assault, harassment and trauma, with women and girls being more at risk then men and boys, as well as resolving issues regarding trafficking (human trafficking & sex trafficking) and slavery.

State non-contributory pensions have been a significant factor in the decline in poverty in Vietnam.

=== Education & Healthcare ===
Access to education and healthcare evidently provides a means of poverty reduction for those vulnerable. For those with access to education already, private tutoring (học thêm in Vietnamese) was a phenomenon that was common for those who could afford to pay for after-school hours. Complex issues about private tutoring such as those who were 'elite' or 'privileged' could afford and access private tutoring whilst the poor had to struggle more to access such services, or that extensive private tuition was an indication of the need to improve public sectors are common arguments of the complexity of the nature of private tuition. For those in extremely poor circumstances, it is more about improving access to educational and healthcare services so that there is a chance of improved socio-economics.

=== See also ===
- Health in Vietnam
- Vietnam – Economy
- Economy of Vietnam
