= Healthcare in Vietnam =

Development of life expectancy in Vietnam

As an upper-middle income country according to the World Bank, Vietnam is currently striving towards a universal health care system through government-provided social health insurance. In 2024, as implemented under the Law on Health Insurance and as reported by Nguyen The Manh, the director general of the Vietnam Social Security (VSS) agency, about 93.4% of the population had health insurance coverage, with nearly 13,000 public and private health facilities receiving over 174 million visits. The government fully covers the health insurance costs of the poor, ethnic minorities, children under 6, and elderly people over 80.

== Legal framework ==
Vietnam's 1992 constitution established a right to healthcare for all citizens. The National Vietnam Health Insurance Program was created the same year. The Healthcare Fund for the Poor was established in 2003. A 2008 law provides for compulsory coverage for children under 6 years old, the elderly, ethnic minorities, and the poor and near-poor. These groups receive full subsidies and students receive partial subsidies under the 2008 law.

== Maternal and child healthcare ==
In June 2011, the United Nations Population Fund released a report on The State of the World's Midwifery. It contained new data on the midwifery workforce and policies relating to newborn and maternal mortality for 59 countries. The 2015 maternal mortality rate per 100,000 births for Vietnam is 56.7. This is compared with 64.3 in 2008 and 157.9 in 1990. The under-5 mortality rate, per 1,000 births, is 24, and the neonatal mortality as a percentage of under-5's mortality is 52. The aim of this report is to highlight ways in which the Millennium Development Goals can be achieved, particularly Goal 4 – Reduce child mortality and Goal 5 – improve maternal health. In Vietnam the number of midwives per 1,000 live births is unavailable and the lifetime risk of death for pregnant women 1 in 850.

=== Prenatal screening ===
Tine M. Gammeltoft, an anthropologist at the University of Copenhagen has described the interplay between the individual and the state during prenatal screening, "In the realm of reproduction, intense sentiments of anxiety, dread, desire, ambition, and hope tie together the state and [Vietnam's] citizens, animating individual aspirations as well as national population policies".

An increase in the prevalence of ultrasound technology in the country has led to more screening for abnormal fetuses.^{[9]} While women in the Western world are commonly offered one or two ultrasounds throughout the entire duration of their pregnancy, it is not uncommon for Vietnamese women to have more than 20 ultrasounds during one pregnancy.^{[9]} The focus of these ultrasounds are often much different than in Western countries, where parents look forward to determining the sex of their baby or seeing photos of the developing fetus. Because of the prevalence of birth defects due to Agent Orange in Vietnam (up to 4 million were affected in the Vietnam War), ultrasounds are often a means for quelling the fears of expectant mothers.^{[9]} The Vietnamese Commission for Population, Family, and Children, gave a statement in 2004 describing their support for prenatal screening in hopes that it may promote population quality that would allow Vietnam to enter into a phase of modernization and industrialization alongside other Southeast Asian countries.^{[9]} This focus on Vietnam's national "stock" was in part based on Japan's efforts beginning in 1945 to strengthen the physicality and quality of their population through genetics programs, encouraging scientists to have many children, and the legalization of marriage with foreigners.^{[9]}

Because of the particularly high prevalence of HIV infections in women of childbearing age world wide, in addition to Vietnam's high HIV/AIDS diagnosis rate, health counseling during the prenatal period is also focused on HIV positive expectant mothers. Since 1996, women have had access to programs designed to reduce transmission of HIV from mother to child, but still face the decision of whether or not to terminate their pregnancy out of concern for the child's long term care. Many women decide to have an abortion because of the fear that they will not be able to care for the child. This is common even when the family desires to have a child.

== Providers ==
=== Public sector ===
Nguyen Truong Son, deputy Minister of Health announced in June 2019 that Electronic Health Records based on social insurance codes would be deployed across the country from July, forming the basis of a national health data system. 6 of the 24 provinces have been piloting this initiative which is intended to be complete by 2025.

==== Hospitals ====
- 108 Hospital in Hanoi
- Bach Mai Hospital in Hanoi
- Viet Duc Hospital in Hanoi
- Cho Ray Hospital in Ho Chi Minh City

=== Private sector ===
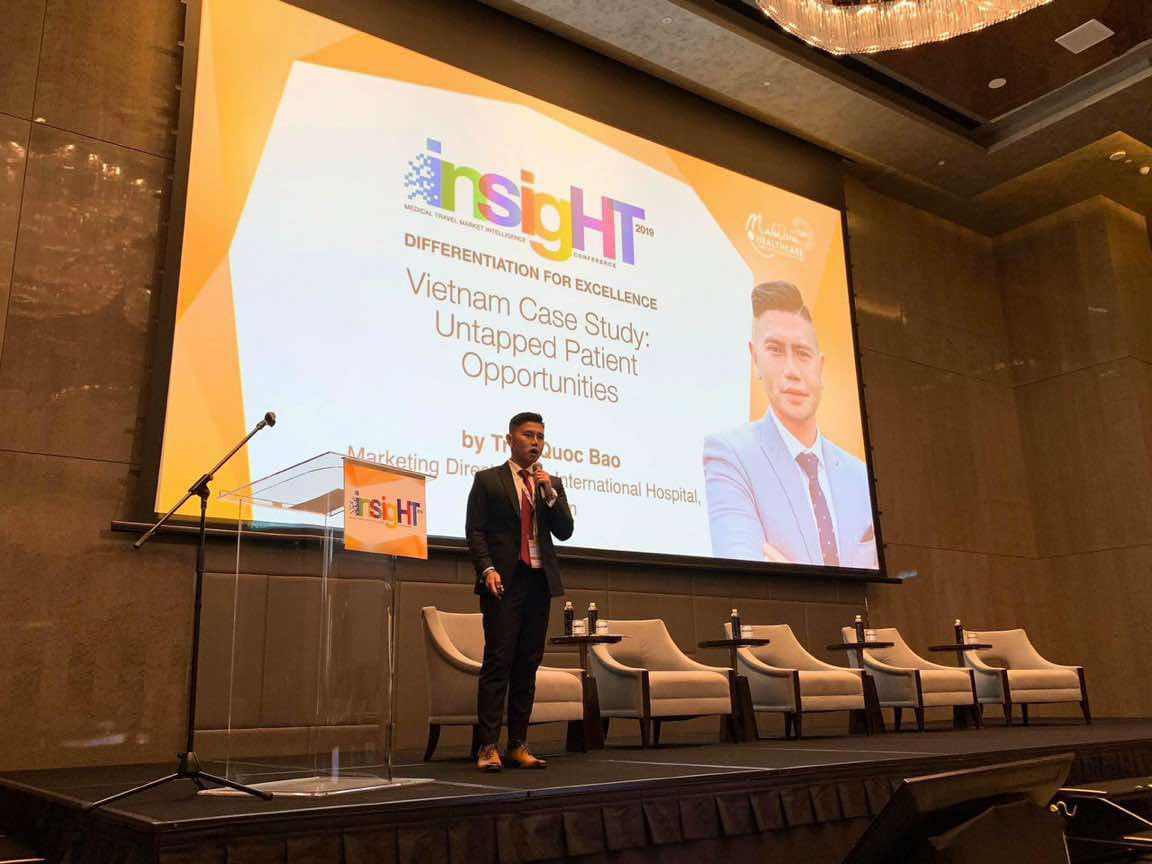
Mr Tran Quoc Bao, Managing Director of City International Hospital

City International Hospital is the largest international hospital with a capacity of 320 beds, 21 medical specialities with a Centre of Excellence in Digital subtraction angiography/ Cath lab in cardiology intervention, neurology intervention. Mr Bao Tran (Tran Quoc Bao), Managing Director of City International Hospital, has been cited in discussions regarding the development of medical tourism in Vietnam. The hospital has been involved in various initiatives to broaden access to healthcare services in Vietnam. In 2019, City International Hospital collaborated with Pharmacity to launch the country's first walk-in clinic brand under the name Pharmacity - CIH Convenient Care Clinic. Other iconic specialities includes General Surgery, Orthopaedics, Women and Children health. it serves 400 thousand outpatients a year. 25% patients of the hospital are foreigners.

Hoan My Medical Corporation is the largest chain of hospitals, with 7 hospitals and 1 clinic across Vietnam, serving 1.8 Million patient visits a year, with medical centers of Excellence in a wide spectrum of specialties, i.e., Cardiology, Orthopedics, Obstetrics, Gynecology, Pediatric, Gerontology, Ophthalmology, Hepatology, and Gastroenterology.

== See also ==
- Health in Vietnam
