= Pensions in Vietnam =

Pensions in Vietnam are provided through a state pension scheme called social insurance, and private life insurance-type schemes. The pension system of Vietnam was ranked 57th out of 70 economies according to a 2020 Allianz report. As of 2020, 11.4% of Vietnamese have reached retirement age, but this number is expected to triple by 2050.

== Retirement age ==
The current retirement age is 60 years for men and 55 for women. Starting January 1, 2021, this will be increased to 62 for men and 60 for women. People employed in dangerous or physically demanding jobs may retire earlier, whereas those in highly skilled jobs may not retire over 5 years the general retirement age.

== State contributory pensions ==
Vietnam has a public pension system. The state pension system, called social insurance, is administered by the government's Social Insurance Agency (SIA). Both public and private sector employees are required to participate, though small businesses often ignore it. A small fixed percentage of an employee's salary is paid to the SIA every month. Upon reaching retirement, the worker is entitled to receive a repayment contributions in a lump sum, or, if they contributed to the SIA for 20 years or more, a lifetime pension. Social insurance pensions are insufficient to live on, and the vast majority of elderly people in Vietnam still depend on their families to care for them regardless of whether or not they receive a pension.

=== History ===
A state pension scheme as part of the social insurance system has existed since 1962 (North Vietnam), but up to 1995 only covered state-owned enterprise workers.

In 1995, the government created the Vietnam Social Security Institute, expanded coverage to private sector workers at businesses with more than twen employees, and incorporated new police, soldiers, and party members into the pension system.

Effective in 2007, the social insurance law created a compulsory pension for public sector employees, salaried private employees with labor contracts of at least one month, and some co-op workers. It also created a voluntary system for non-salaried workers, the self-employed, and workers without wages.

=== Funding ===
Public servants, state-owned enterprise workers, and contract-based private sector workers are subject to mandatory pension contributions of 22%, of which 14% is paid by employers and 8% is paid by employees. For other workers, including Vietnamese abroad and foreigners, this is voluntary. As of 2014, a total of 11.5 million Vietnamese workers paid pension contributions.

== State non-contributory pensions ==
People aged 60-79 who are under the poverty line receive a means-tested noncontributory pension.

For those over 80 and/or disabled, the benefits are higher, starting at VND 180,000 (about $9.5 in 2010). As of 2012, 1.43 million elderly were receiving these benefits.

The state non-contributory pensions have been a significant factor in the decline in poverty in Vietnam.

== Voluntary supplemental pension plans ==
Since 2013, large companies can offer voluntary supplemental pension plans. These are regulated by Circular No. 115 (2013), Decree No. 88 (2016), and Circular No. 86 (2017). Voluntary supplemental pension plans can be either organized under a trust and managed by a life insurance company supervised by the Ministry of Finance or they may be offered on a contract model managed by a pension fund enterprise.
