= Nguyen Quang Dieu High School for the Gifted =

Coordinates: 10.4729°N 105.6480°E

Nguyễn Quang Diêu High School for the Gifted
- Trường THPT chuyên Nguyễn Quang Diêu
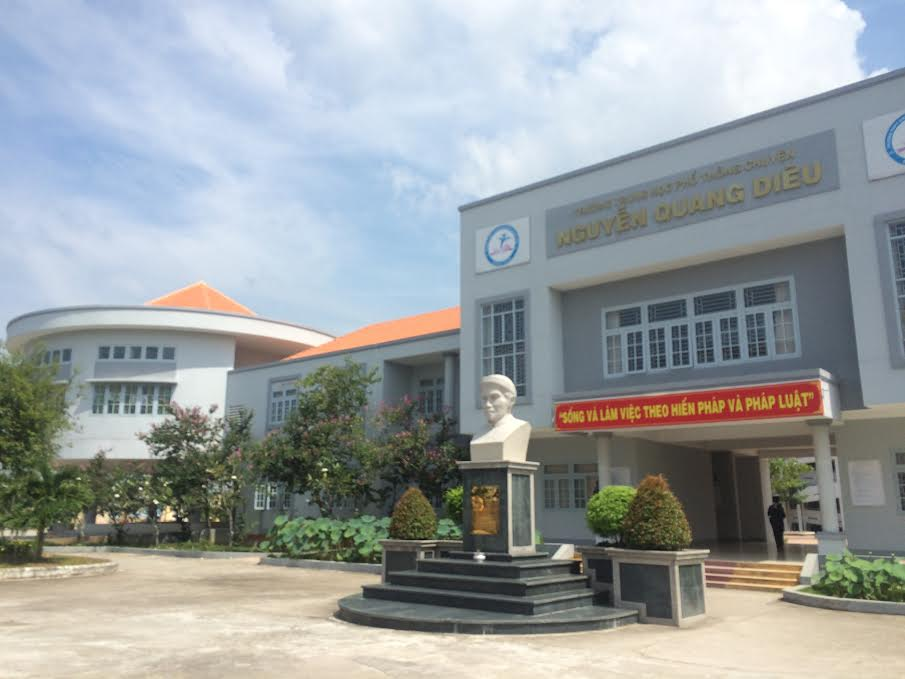

Location
- 485 Lê Đại Hành Street, Mỹ Phú Ward; Cao Lãnh, Đồng Tháp; Vietnam

Information
- Type: Public high school
- Motto: Creative Teaching – Active Learning – High Quality
- Established: July 8, 2011
- Oversight: Đồng Tháp Department of Education and Training
- Principal: Mr. Tran Minh Luan
- Faculty: 64
- Grades: 10 to 12
- Enrollment: 800 (2015–2016)
- Student to teacher ratio: 35:1
- Campus: urban, 1,575 square meters (16,950 sq ft)
- Website: thpt-chuyennguyenquangdieu.dongthap.edu.vn/v3/

Nguyễn Quang Diêu High School for the Gifted, or NQD, is a public high school located in Cao Lãnh city, Đồng Tháp province, Vietnam. NQD is one of only two gifted schools in Đồng Tháp province, the other being Nguyễn Đình Chiểu High School in Sa Đéc city, and it officially opened on July 8, 2011. With over 800 students participating in the eight major subjects offered during the 2015–2016 academic year, NQD is one of the largest schools in Đồng Tháp province.

== History ==
Nguyễn Quang Diêu High School for the Gifted, formerly known as Cao Lãnh City High School, was originally established in 1956 in Kien Phong province. On July 8, 2011, because of the need for better-equipped facilities, Nguyễn Quang Diêu High school for the Gifted separated from Cao Lãnh City High School and moved to a new building. It now resides at its current address on Le Dai Hanh Street in the My Phu Ward.

NQD is named after the eponymous scholar and poet, Sir Nguyễn Quang Diêu. Not only was Sir Nguyễn Quang Diêu known for his literary achievements, but he was also a famous patriot who joined the Đông Du Movement in Southern Vietnam to fight against French colonial rule. While originally from present-day Cao Lãnh city, Sir Nguyễn Quang Diêu is known across Vietnam as a national hero.

== Campus ==
NQD began its expansion project with a groundbreaking ceremony on July 8, 2011. The campus is now 1575 square meters and has three distinct areas devoted to offices, classrooms, and laboratories. In the three-story tall main building, there are a total of twenty-seven traditional classrooms, each equipped with high-tech smart televisions, as well as eight laboratories for various science classes. In the center of the school is a large, open courtyard. While this area is primarily used for Physical education, Defense Education, and Monday morning flag-saluting ceremonies, students also socialize there during breaks and after school.

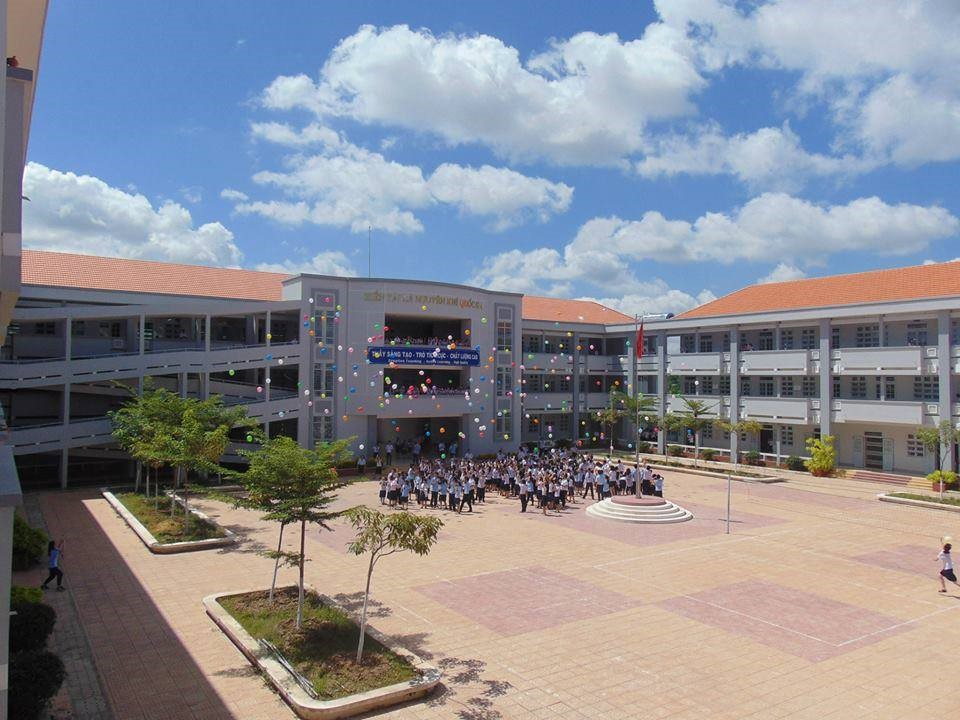
Students celebrate in the main courtyard

Moreover, NQD has an on-campus cafeteria that serves breakfast, lunch, and snacks. Nearby, there is a modest lotus lake and koi pond. Students are expected to help upkeep the school by helping plant trees, cleaning their respective classrooms, and protecting the facilities from damage.

Currently, NQD is in the process of building dormitories behind the school for future students to live in. They will be adding other modern facilities as well, such as a swimming pool and a sports stadium.

=== Traditions ===
Before the long Tết holiday break, NQD holds its annual camping day tradition. Students sleep at the school overnight and participate in a variety of games, performances, and contests. The festivities also feature a large bonfire, around which students perform dance routines with their classes.

== Students and faculty ==
During the 2015–2016 academic year, NQD had more than 800 students hailing from many districts across Đồng Tháp province. However, most of these students matriculated into NQD from Kim Hong Secondary School or Nguyen Thi Luu Secondary School, both of which can be found in Cao Lãnh city. Like most high schools in Vietnam, NQD only instructs students in grades 10, 11, and 12. There are approximately 270 students enrolled in each grade. In 2015, there was a 100% graduation rate.

NQD has 64 well-qualified teachers. As of 2015, twenty-seven of these teachers hold master's degrees is various fields. For most classes, there is 35:1 student-teacher ratio. In August 2015, NQD welcomed a United States Fulbright English Teaching Assistant to aid their English language learning for a ten-month period.

== Academics ==
In order to be accepted into NQD, students must take an entry examination organized by the Đồng Tháp Department of Education and Training. The test consists of three compulsory subjects (Mathematics, Literature, and English) and one major subject of the student's choosing. The 35 students with the highest total scores will be admitted into the aforementioned major class. NQD also offers one non-major class, which usually has about 40 students. Along with the one non-major class, known as 'A' class, NQD offers eight majors: Literature, English, Biology, Chemistry, Physics, Informatics, and Mathematics. After each semester, students are evaluated based on a benchmark. Those who qualify will receive scholarships from NQD's Study Promotion Association in recognition of their hard-work, creating greater incentive for students to focus on their studies.

=== Testing ===
As is normal in Vietnam, seniors must take the National Graduation Exam in order to graduate and apply for university.

=== Awards ===
Nguyễn Quang Diêu High School for the Gifted is known as a top school in the region and has been ranked 60th out of more than 2000 high schools in Vietnam. Moreover, in the 2013–2014 academic year, NQD students won 22 National Prizes, 220 Provincial Awards, and 62 Regional Awards. During April 30 Olympic Contest held in Ho Chi Minh City that same year, NQD students earned 7 Gold Medals, 11 Silver Medals, and 12 Bronze Medals.

== Extracurricular activities ==
During the school year of 2015 – 2016, NQD offered students many extracurricular activities. By offering scholarships for involved students, NQD encourages active participation in these clubs.

=== Academic Clubs ===
There are 3 official academic clubs: Mathematics, Literature, and English, as well as several academic teams. There have been many competitions and tests held by these clubs to help students improve their practical skills and prepare for the Graduation Examination. Furthermore, these clubs usually hold some academic classes, meetings, and other events for NQD students and, occasionally, students from other local schools.

==== Literature Club ====
This club organizes several meetings during the school year, often around famous Vietnamese poets and writers. It also host some events for special traditional holidays, like Vietnamese Teacher's Day.

==== English Club ====
The English Speaking Club (ESC) includes 14 organizers and over 100 members. It holds meetings every 2 weeks with various topics. Furthermore, it holds large-scale events for both traditional Vietnamese holidays, like Mid-Autumn Festival, as well as Western holidays, like Halloween and Christmas.

==== Athletics ====
There are two athletic clubs: volleyball and basketball clubs. As an annual occasion, the school organizes a competition among classes. Students practice together after school and participate in the school’s competition. The best team is chosen to attend the provincial contest.

=== Fine Arts Clubs ===
Each year, the Art Club hosts Nguyễn Quang Diêu’s Got Talent. Moreover, the Art Service Team and its 50 members is run by the NQD's Youth Union. These members prepare performances for events as well as participate in local art competitions.
