= Blood cashews =

2011 Human Rights Watch report

Blood cashews is the media term for a 2011 Human Rights Watch (HRW) report on cashew production in Vietnam, The Rehab Archipelago, which claimed human rights abuses in the use of people in drug-detention centres.

Vietnam is known as the world's largest cashew nut exporter with 24.5 percent share of the global cashew market. It was reported that Vietnam earned US$232 million from exporting 45,000 tons of cashew nuts in the first four months of 2010.

== Problems and impacts ==
Under the authority of the police force and local officials, drug users are usually detained for two years. “Post-rehabilitation management” would take place for additional two or three years after the completion of the two years of detention.

This practice is carried out in the absence of judicial oversight. From the interview conducted by the HRW, it was observed that from the 34 interviewees, who were recently detained in 14 of 16 centers, administered by the Ho Chi Minh City authorities, none received legal consultation from a lawyer, or has appeared in court before or during their detention. In short, there was a miscarriage of justice and an abuse of human rights.

Based on statistics, there were close to 40,000 people with the majority being young men. They were detained at the country's 123 drug rehabilitation centers and made to carry out “labour therapy”, which involves sewing garments, making bricks or processing cashews.

Those who refused to obey the orders of the officers will be beaten with batons, given electric shocks, locked in isolation, deprived of food and water, and obliged to work even longer hours. In return for their labor, these detainees are only paid merely a few dollars a month; some were even made to pay for their food and lodging, demonstrating an exploitation of labour.

Besides having to work under such harsh conditions, the processing of cashew nuts also poses threats to the detainees’ health. This is because the cashew oil is caustic and burns the skin; dust from the skin also causes cough and other health conditions. This labour therapy serves little or almost zero therapeutic effects to the detainees.

== Current efforts ==
The Vietnam Cashew Association was established in the 1990s, with the objectives to oversee and regulate the cashew nuts industry. With their mission targeted to develop a sustainable cashew industry as well as to promote socioeconomic development for the country. However, little efforts are being put in to oversee and regulate the supply chain line of the cashew manufacturers.

As the detainees are not aware of the rights they deserve, it puts them at a disadvantage in the current situation. To monitor and protect the rights of these detainees, cashew importers are called on to ensure their supply chains are not tainted with forced labour and abuse. Cashew importers need to closely scrutinize the source of supply of the cashew nut products.
