= Health in Vietnam =

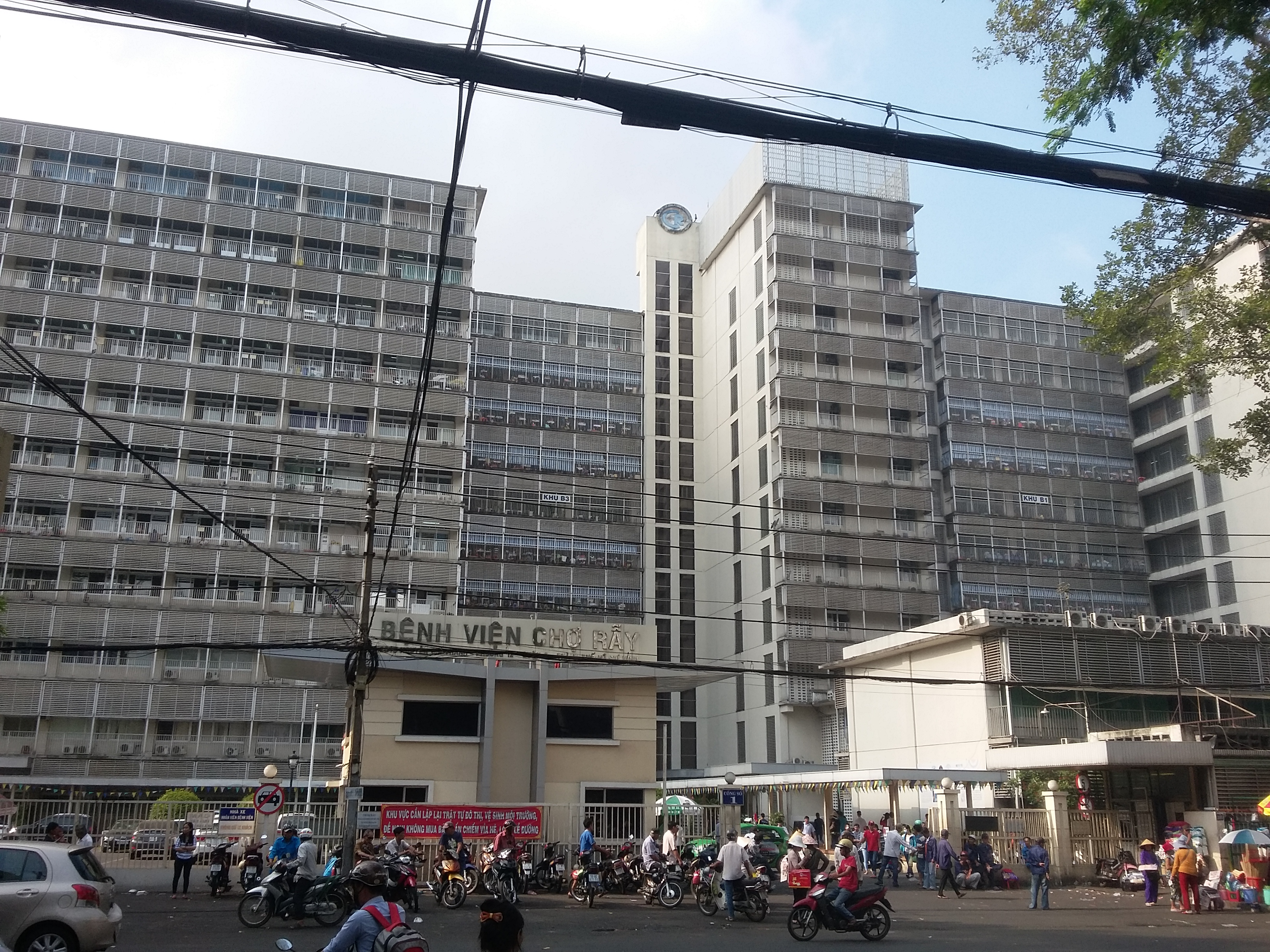
Cho Ray Hospital, the largest hospital in Ho Chi Minh City

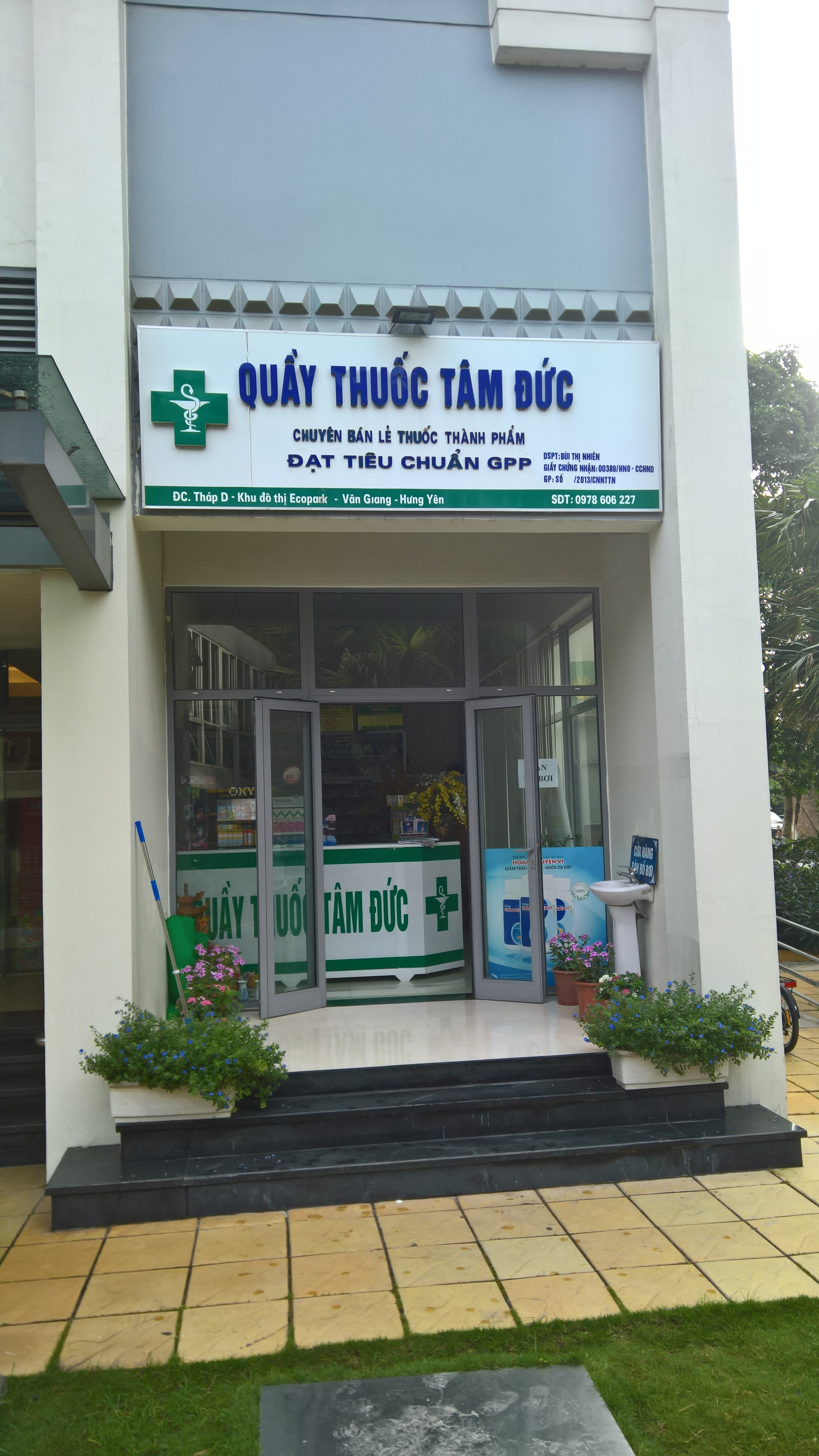
Pharmacy in Vietnam

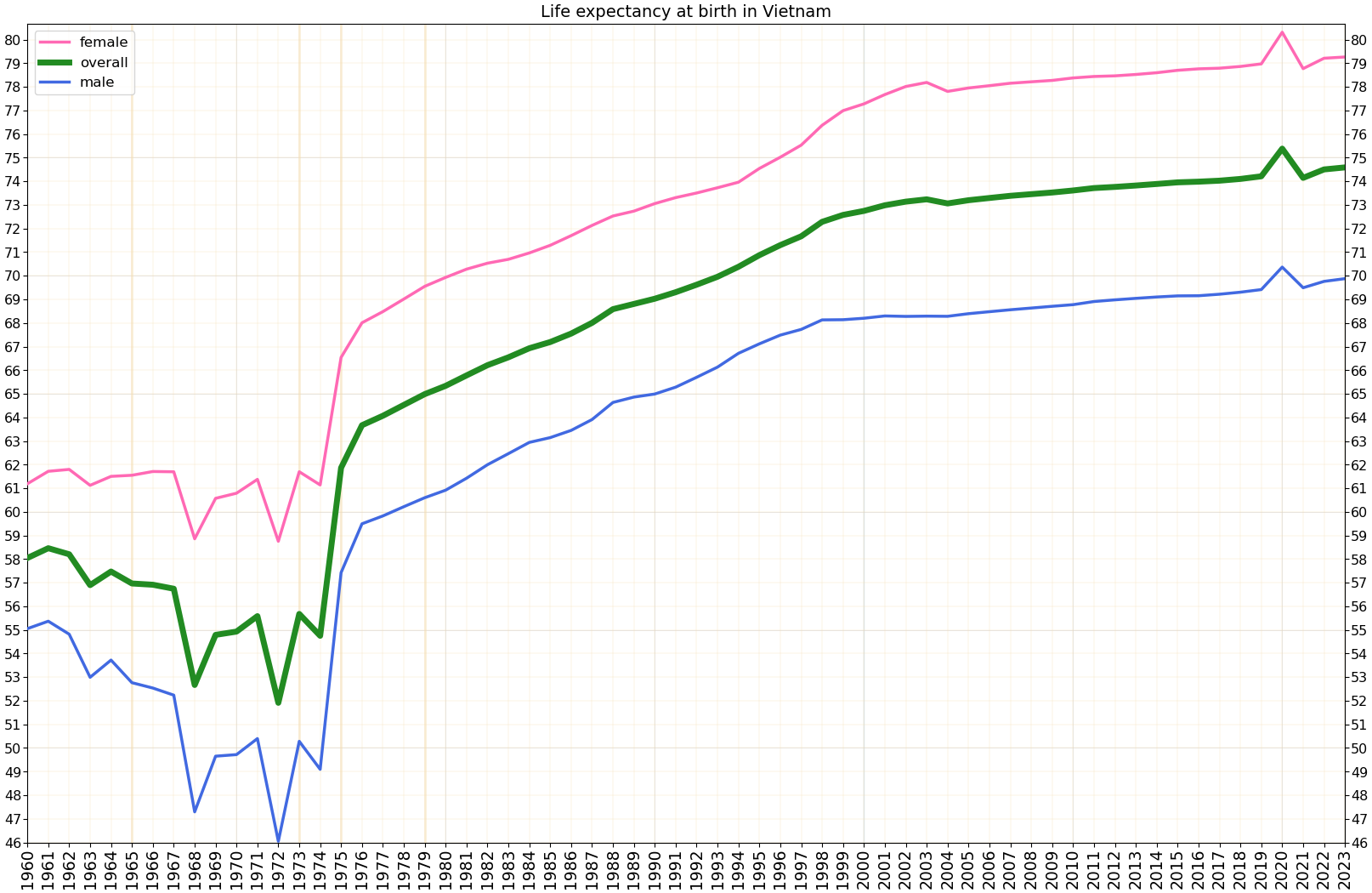
Life expectancy in Vietnam

Health in Vietnam encompasses general and specific concerns to the region, its history, and various socioeconomic status, such as dealing with malnutrition, effects of Agent Orange as well as psychological issues from the Vietnam War, tropical diseases, and other issues such as underdeveloped healthcare systems or inadequate ratio of healthcare or social workers to patients.

Life expectancy for both males and females in Vietnam increased by two years between 2000 and 2012, which is only half of the average increase observed globally during the same period This is half of the average rise in life expectancy for other parts of the world during the same time period. Meanwhile, Vietnam's healthcare sector is experiencing rapid expansion. Industry forecasts project that healthcare expenditure will nearly double, rising from US$18.5 billion in 2022 to US$33.8 billion by 2030, reflecting a compound annual growth rate (CAGR) of 7.6%.

Malnutrition is still not as common as it was in the provinces and the government spending on health care corresponded to just 0.9 percent of gross domestic product (GDP). Government subsidies covered only about 20 percent of health care expenses, with the remaining 80 percent coming out of individuals' own pockets. Although cases of malnutrition has decreased overall, it still remains a concern, particularly among the ethnic minority.

In 2012, almost 22% of deaths could be attributed to strokes. This leading cause of death was followed by heart disease with 7% of deaths, and Chronic obstructive pulmonary disease with 4.9% of deaths. The two largest risk factors for adults are tobacco use and raised blood pressure.

The Human Rights Measurement Initiative finds that Vietnam is doing 91.1% of what should be possible at its level of income, for the right to health. Human rights experts have identified individuals such as members of labour unions, people suspected of political violence, and journalists as particularly at risk of having their right to health violated.

Additionally, as Vietnam is also within the tropical zone, tropical diseases have also been a major concern past and present, such as from malaria, dengue fever, etc., where branches of medicine such as tropical medicine or infectious disease was required to help treat patients. Neglected tropical diseases have also been a concern as well.

== Health Issues ==
Beginning in the late 1980s, the quality of health care began to decline as a result of budgetary constraints, a shift of responsibility to the provinces, and the introduction of charges. Inadequate funding had led to delays in planned upgrades to water supply and sewage systems. Consequently, at that time almost half the population had no access to clean water, a deficiency that promotes such infectious diseases as malaria, dengue fever, typhoid, and cholera. Additionally, inadequate funding has contributed to a shortage of nurses, midwives, and hospital beds. In 2000, Vietnam had only 250,000 hospital beds, or 14.8 beds per 10,000 people, a very low ratio among Asian nations, according to the World Bank. Government expenditure on health has declined and the health system is largely financed through user-fees, which has direct implications for the rural poor, deterring them from accessing health care. As of 2017, Vietnam has a population of 96.1 million people. Drug-resistant tuberculosis, pathogenic influenza, HIV/AIDS, and smoking are continuous problems that impact the quality of health in Vietnam. Health risk factors such as smoking and the lack of funding for healthcare attribute to the epigenetic health of the population In 2008, the Government of Vietnam adopted a USAID methadone program that served 50,000 clients. Since 2014, Vietnam is transitioning its country to a universal healthcare system since 70% of its citizens have to pay out-of-pocket payments. There is also an inadequate ratio of doctors to patients. There are 8 doctors for every 10,000 patients. Preventive treatments such as the HPV vaccination are prohibitively expensive, and thus not effective in battling chronic diseases.

=== Agent Orange ===
Several health defects have been correlated with the use of the chemical dioxin, also known as Agent Orange, during the Resistance War Against America (Vietnam War). Dioxin was used by U.S. military forces in the war as a defoliant and is now considered a carcinogen. Major differences in dioxin levels have been measured in the blood and breast milk of those living in areas that had been sprayed with Agent Orange when compared to other areas of Vietnam. This carcinogen is associated with tumors, immune deficiency, reproductive and developmental disorders, nervous system defects, and a variety of other birth defects including Spina bifida. Agent Orange continues to be a risk factor in Vietnam today because of its continued presence in soil, wildlife, and food. In addition, the effects continue to be seen in generations born to those exposed to Agent orange. Beginning in 2007, Vietnam Veterans in the US are now compensated for detrimental health effects due to exposure.

=== Psychological issues ===
Psychological warfare was practiced in Vietnam in the form of Operation Wandering Soul from U.S. forces against North Vietnamese and Viet Cong soldiers, which continues to be a risk factor in the form of intergenerational trauma for descendants of war. Social stigma around the issues of psychological ailments make it difficult to access required help, including issues revolving around anxiety, stress, alcoholism, depression, etc., which may be compounded by the effects of natural disasters or chronic poverty. Younger generations psychological issues may stem from increased access to the online world, causing overthinking, anxiety, insomnia.

=== Malaria ===
Vietnam has made progress in combating malaria, for which the mortality rate declined sharply, to about 5 percent of the rate in the early 1990s, after the country introduced antimalarial drugs and treatment.

=== Tuberculosis ===
Vietnam has the 13th highest tuberculosis burden in the world. There are an estimated 89 positive cases for every 100,000 individuals.^{[7]} Approximately 55 tuberculosis-related deaths occur in Vietnam each day. Vietnam's healthcare system consists of four levels: the central level headed by the Ministry of Health (MOH), provincial health services, district health services, and commune health centers. The Viet Nam National Tuberculosis Control Program (NTP) worked with a control strategy recommended by the World Health Organization to lower Tuberculosis (TB) rates, and successfully exceeded target goals in 1997.^{[7]} However, although there was a decrease in TB incidence among women and persons over 35, the rates of Tuberculosis among young men in Vietnam significantly increased during this time, causing a stabilization of the overall rate.^{[7]} In 1989, the Ministry of Health in Vietnam addressed the tuberculosis burden by establishing the National Institute of Tuberculosis and Lung Diseases and implementing the DOTS strategy as a national priority. The National Institute of Tuberculosis supports developing TB- related strategies and managing guidelines for the different levels of healthcare in Vietnam. At the provincial level, there are health centers that diagnose and treat patients. The district health services detect tuberculosis and provide stipends to treat patients. District health services work on detecting TB, providing stipends for treatment, implementing DOTS strategy, and supervising TB programs at the commune level. The commune level provides treatment and vaccination for children. All four levels work together not only to provide ongoing treatment and examination, but also to establish trust in the government health services implemented through community relationships and a close network of doctors, faculty, and patients. With an intensified vaccination program, better hygiene, and foreign assistance, Vietnam hopes to sharply reduce the number of TB cases and annual number of new infections.^{[2]}

In 2002, Vietnam also implemented a communication plan to provide accurate information in order to respond to any barriers or misconceptions about tuberculosis treatment. The government worked with the World Health Organization, Center for Disease and Control Prevention, and local medical non-profits such as Friends for International Tuberculosis Relief to provide information about the causes of TB, sources of infection, how it is transmitted, symptoms, treatment, and prevention.

A 2012 study of tuberculosis control in Vietnam identified a shortcoming in the current strategy of attending solely to symptomatic patients, as it has not been marked by any significant decrease in TB rates. Instead, the authors of the research advocated for a strategy of contact tracing that would focus on household members of Tuberculosis patients in Hanoi. The study found a high incidence of TB rates in the household contacts tested and concluded that household contact investigation would be a feasible disease management strategy in Vietnam.

=== Smoking ===
In Vietnam, 40,000 people die due to tobacco-related diseases. Smoking continues to be seen as a risk-taking behaviour and is associated with a male predilection, especially with traditional tobacco pipes such as the use of Thuốc Lào (Nicotiana rustica). Thirty percent of heart disease deaths are caused by smoking cigarettes. Lung cancer is the third leading cause of death in Vietnam and tobacco risk factors that cause death and disability. Vietnam has reduced the supply of tobacco products through the ratification of the World Health Organization Framework Convention on Tobacco Control. Examples of steps towards tobacco prevention is banning the advertisement of tobacco, requiring health warnings on tobacco packaging, and increasing tobacco taxes. In 2013, Vietnam launched the National Strategy on Tobacco Control which prohibits smoking in indoor public and workspaces in an effort to significantly reduce smoking rates across many demographic groups. The goal is to reduce smoking rates among youth (15–24 years old) from 26% (2011) to 18% (2020), and adult males from 47.4% (2011) to 39% (2020). In 2018, the World Health Organization surveyed that one in two male adults (45.3%) were smoking tobacco. Vietnam's government is incorporating a plan that will utilize the taxes from tobacco and alcohol to cover the cost of universal healthcare and make sure its population is ensured.

=== HIV and AIDS ===
As of January 2005, Vietnam had diagnosed 101,291 human immunodeficiency virus (HIV) cases, of which 16,528 developed acquired immune deficiency syndrome (AIDS) and 9,554 died. But the actual number of HIV-positive individuals is estimated to be much higher. An average of 40–50 new infections are reported every day in Vietnam. Vietnam hopes to contain the HIV infection rate at the current official rate of 0.35 percent, which is about average worldwide, by limiting the disease as much as possible to sex workers and intravenous drug users. However, if the current trend continues, the number of infected persons could reach 1 million by 2010. One of the impediments to containing HIV/AIDS is that the victims face discrimination and stigmatization that are more severe than almost anywhere else in the world, according to a United Nations official. However non-governmental organizations, like the Supporting Community Development Initiatives (SCDI) for example, are devoted to improve the situation and quality of life of HIV/AIDS affected people. In June 2004, the Bush Administration announced that Vietnam would be one of 15 nations to receive funding as part of a US$15 billion global AIDS plan.

People who inject drugs, commercial sex workers and potential clients, and men who have sex with other men are the most at-risk and susceptible to HIV infections in Vietnam. Since the mid-1990s, the United States Agency for International Development (USAID) collaborates with the Government of Vietnam at the national, provincial, and district levels through delivering preventive care and treatment services, advocating to strengthen the health system, and providing sustainable long-term plans. USAID provides a community-based approach by treating patients with anti-retroviral treatments. USAID helps provide funding to achieve Vietnam's "90-90-90" goals which is to ensure 90% of people that have HIV are aware they have HIV, 90% of people diagnosed with HIV will receive anti-retroviral therapy, and 90% of people receiving treatment will be able to see the virus suppressed. Most of the testing occurs in Hanoi, Quang Ninh, Dong Nai, Tay Ninh, Tien Giang, and Ho Chi Minh City.

=== Dengue Fever ===
Vietnam experienced an epidemic of dengue fever when 181,054 infection cases and 30 deaths were reported in almost localities in Hanoi and Ho Chi Minh City. As many as 14,079 dengue fever cases with three deaths have been reported in the first four months of 2018. In the first 8 months of 2019, 130,000 cases of dengue have been reported, and 16 deaths. The 2019 outbreak is concentrated in Ho Chi Minh City, Da Nang, Khanh Hoa, Ba Ria-Vung Tai and Binh Duong provinces. In 2023, Hanoi experienced up to 4 times the cases of dengue fever then in the same period of 2022.

=== Pandemics ===
Vietnam is located in the tropical and temperate zone and prone to zoonotic diseases. In recent years, the country has been affected by SARS, avian influenza A(H5N1), influenza A (H5N6), and COVID-19, although the spillovers of viruses from animals to humans is attributed to the agriculture-centered economy and animal consumption.

In the light of COVID-19 pandemic, Vietnam was praised by the international community to have successfully contained the spread of the disease with no deaths yet as being reported by mid-April 2020. The Global Health Security Agenda and USAID address the disease surveillance and outbreak response in Vietnam through operational platforms and creating disease portfolios with animal origins. On February 1, 2020, the Vietnamese government suspended all flights to and from China in order to combat COVID-19, making it one of the first countries to enforce travel restrictions. The country then implemented a 21-day quarantine in Vinh Phuc province. Vietnam is a single-party state with a centralized government that is able to utilize its military resources in order to implement surveillance and contact tracing. Vietnam also has the lowest COVID-19 mortality rates (As of 2021 and 2022).

=== Climate change ===
Climate warming will directly or indirectly affect the spread of many infectious diseases, especially for the occurrence and spread of insect-borne diseases such as malaria, viral encephalitis and dengue. As the temperature of the sea surface rises, the incidence of disease transmitted through the water body will also increase. Tran Thi Giang Huong, Director of the Department of International Cooperation of the Ministry of Health of Vietnam, stated in 2017 that "from 2030 to 2050, climate change will cause, every year, 250,000 people's death from malnutrition, malaria, diarrhoea and heat shock" globally, according to the World Health Organization.

=== Illicit Drug use ===
Although over the years illicit narcotics trade has decreased via application of stringent laws, the opioid epidemic such as with heroin and cocaine still remains a concern, especially with Vietnam's geographical proximity to the Golden Triangle in Southeast Asia that stretches across China, Myanmar, Thailand, Laos. Illicit drugs such as illegal meth use also remains a concern. Additionally, whilst views on the health effects on cannabis may vary, cannabis is classified as an illegal narcotic in Vietnam and concerns remain about it being associated with illegal worldwide trafficking.
