= Hoàng Thị Minh Hồng =

Vietnamese environmental defender (born 1972)

- Born: 5 October 1972 (age 53); Hanoi, Vietnam
- Education: VNU University of Languages and International Studies
- Occupation: Environmental defender
- Criminal charges: Tax evasion
- Criminal penalty: 3 years imprisonment
- Criminal status: Released
- Website: vn.linkedin.com/in/hong-hoang-7b44bb3

Hoàng Thị Minh Hồng (born 5 October 1972) is a Vietnamese environmental human rights defender who founded and directed an environmental rights organization. In 2023, she was imprisoned for tax evasion, after a trial which has been criticized by the United Nations, non-governmental organizations, and countries such as the United States as being politically motivated.

Hồng was pardoned and released from prison on Friday, September 20, 2024, nearly 16 months after the arrest. She and her family resided in the United States from December 2024.

== Activities ==
Hồng worked for the World Wildlife Fund from 2002 to 2009. Later she founded "Change" (styled CHANGE VN and an acronym for Centre of Hands-on Actions and Networking for Growth and Environment) which worked on environmental issues in Vietnam from 2013 to 2022. It was a national non-profit organization with the mission of raising awareness and inspiring the community to protect nature, the environment, and wildlife; combat climate change; and promote sustainable development. Hồng's decision in 2022 to close down the organization was partly because several environmental activists were arrested that year and in 2021. In 2023, she started an environmental consultancy called CHOICE.

In 1997, she was the first Vietnamese person to set foot on Antarctica and became a UNESCO Young Envoy. In 2015, Climate Heroes listed her as an environmental hero. In 2018, former U.S. President Barack Obama wrote that Hồng was one of the young people who inspired him during the year; she was the first Vietnamese person to win an Obama Foundation scholarship at Columbia University. In 2019, she was one of five recipients of the Inspirational Ambassador award at the 2019 WeChoice Awards and won the title Green Warrior of the Year at the Elle Style Awards. Also in 2019, Forbes magazine voted Hồng as one of the 50 most influential women in Vietnam.

== Conviction for tax evasion ==
In June 2023, Hồng was detained on charges of tax evasion. Hồng was the fifth environmental activist arrested on this charge, after Mai Phan Lợi, Đặng Đình Bách, Ngụy Thị Khanh, and Bạch Hùng Dương. Previously, when four other environmental activists were arrested in October 2022, Hồng announced the dissolution of the Change organization after ten years of operation.

Ben Swanton, co-director of Project 88 working for human rights in Vietnam, said that immediately after the four environmental activists were arrested for tax evasion in 2021–2022, Hồng asked for an official ruling from the City Tax Department on the tax status of the Change organization. The tax department's response, according to Swanton, "is evidence of Change's tax-exempt status. Therefore, it is completely illegal for the police to now charge Hồng with tax evasion."

On 28 September 2023, Hồng was tried at Ho Chi Minh City's People's Court, found guilty of evading about US$280,000 of tax, which she was ordered to repay in full amount, fined 100 million đồng (just over US$4,000), plus a court fee of 96 million đồng, and sentenced to three years in prison.

=== Reactions ===
==== United Nations and foreign countries ====
The United Nations human rights agency noted that Hồng was the fifth environmental activist arrested for tax evasion in Vietnam in two years. The United Nations believes that the arrests are part of a broader trend of the Vietnamese government suppressing freedom of expression. In July 2023, the United Nations special rapporteur on Human Rights and UN experts wrote to the government — however, after 60 days the government had not replied and the rapporteur published the letter.

Multiple foreign governments said that the Just Energy Transition Partnership (international funding for phasing out coal power in Vietnam) needed the participation of civil society activists. The United States took the view that the arrests were part of a broader trend of the Vietnamese government suppressing freedom of expression, with U.S. State Department spokesman Matthew Miller stating in June 2023 that it was "concerned about the detention of leadership and staff of the CHANGE organization, including the ongoing detention of its founder Hoàng Thị Minh Hồng"; the same month, the British Foreign Ministry called for "the Vietnamese government to respect all human rights, including freedom of expression and association" and later, in October, the European Union urged Vietnam to ensure its actions are consistent with its international commitments".

==== Human rights organizations ====
Phil Robertson, deputy director of the Asia Division of Human Rights Watch (HRW), accused the Vietnamese authorities of "using the vaguely worded tax code as a weapon to punish environmental leaders whom the ruling Communist Party deems a threat to their power", while Ben Swanton, co-director of Project 88 working for Vietnamese human rights, said the trial was "a total sham" and that the law was "being weaponized for the purpose of political persecution".

In June 2023, sixty-five human rights and environmental organizations published an open letter to former U.S. President Barack Obama, asking him to publicly call on the Vietnamese government to release Hồng unconditionally. They said that her arrest was one in a series of politically motivated prosecutions that used false accusations of tax evasion to criminalize climate protection activities.
