= List of coal-fired power stations in Vietnam =

About 20 GW of power stations in Vietnam are coal-fired. In 2019 coal-fired power stations were generated almost 40% of Vietnams electricity and was about a quarter of the coal was imported.

Source: Initial query from Coal Tracker, updated with data from MOIT 2019 Report 58/BC-CBT, updated using press released, updated from PDP 7A

Power plants (with units)	Other names	Sponsor	Capacity (MW)	Status	Province	Commission date	Source	Note
An Khanh – Bac Giang	Luc Nam power station	An Khanh – Bac Giang Thermoelectric Joint Stock Company	650	pre-permit	Bac Giang	2023	MOIT Report 58/BC-CBT annex row V.4	
An Khanh 1	Khanh Hoa power station	An Khanh Electricity JSC	2×58	operating	Thai Nguyen	2015		
Cam Pha Phase I-II		Vietnam National Coal and Mineral Industries Group	2×340	operating	Quang Ninh	2011		
Cao Ngan		Vietnam National Coal and Mineral Industries Group	2×57.5	operating	Thai Nguyen	2006		
Cong Thanh		Cong Thanh Thermal Power Joint Stock Company	600	permitted	Thanh Hoa	2024	MOIT Report 58/BC-CBT annex row V.3	
Dong Nai Formosa Unit 1–2		Hung Nghiep Formosa	2×150	operating	Dong Nai	2004		
Dong Nai Formosa Unit 3		Hung Nghiep Formosa	150	operating	Dong Nai	2018		
Duc Giang – Lao Cai Chemical		Duc Giang – Lao Cai Chemicals Joint Stock Company	2×50	pre-permit	Lao Cai	2020		
Dung Quat Special Economic Zone (J-Power) Phase I-II		J-Power	2400 & 2000	announced	Quang Ngai	2028–2030		
Duyen Hai 1		Electricity of Vietnam	2×622	operating	Tra Vinh	2015		
Duyen Hai 2		Janakuasa SDN BHD	2×600	construction	Tra Vinh	2021–2022	MOIT Report 58/BC-CBT annex row IV.3	
Duyen Hai 3 Extension		Electricity of Vietnam	660	construction	Tra Vinh	2019	MOIT Report 58/BC-CBT annex row I.9	
Duyen Hai 3		Electricity of Vietnam	2×622	operating	Tra Vinh	2016	MOIT Report 58/BC-CBT annex row I.4	
Ha Tinh Formosa Plastics Steel Complex Unit 1,2,5,6,7,10	Formosa Ha Tinh	Hung Nghiep Formosa Ha Tinh	6×150	operating: Unit 1,2,5 pre-permit: Unit 6,7,10	Ha Tinh	2015–2020		
Hai Duong	Hai Duong BOT plant	JAKS Resources, China Power Engineering Consulting Group	2×600	construction	Hai Duong	2021	MOIT Report 58/BC-CBT annex row IV.2	
Hai Ha CHP 1–4	Dong Phat Hai Ha (CHP)	Texhong Hai Ha Industrial Park Co.	2100	pre-permit	Quang Ninh	2019–2030	MOIT Report 58/BC-CBT annex row V.2	
Hai Phong 1–2		EVN Genco No 2	4×300	operating	Hai Phong	2011–2014		
Hai Phong 3 Unit 1–2		Vietnam National Coal and Mineral Industries Group	2×600	pre-permit	Hai Phong	2028–2029	MOIT Report 58/BC-CBT annex row III.4	
Lee & Man		Lee & Man Vietnam Paper Limited Company	50 & 75	operating	Hau Giang	2018		
Long An Phase I		no investor	2×600	announced	Long An		MOIT Report 58/BC-CBT annex row VI.1	
Long An Phase II		no investor	2×800	announced	Long An		MOIT Report 58/BC-CBT annex row VI.2	
Long Phu 1		PetroVietnam Power Corp	2x600	construction	Soc Trang	2023–2024	MOIT Report 58/BC-CBT annex row II.2	
Long Phu 2		Tata Group	2×660	pre-permit	Soc Trang	2029–2030	MOIT Report 58/BC-CBT annex row IV.8	
Long Phu 3 BANPU – THAILAND	Soc Trang	announced	2×600				MOIT Report 58/BC-CBT annex row II.4	
Mao Khe		Vietnam National Coal and Mineral Industries Group	2×220	operating	Quang Ninh	2013		
Mong Duong 1		Electricity of Vietnam	2×540	operating	Quang Ninh	2015		
Mong Duong 2		AES-VCM Mong Dong Power Co Ltd	2×620	operating	Quang Ninh	2015		
Na Duong 1		Vietnam National Coal and Mineral Industries Group	2×55	operating	Lang Son	2005		
Na Duong 2		Vietnam National Coal and Mineral Industries Group	110	construction	Lang Son	2022	MOIT Report 58/BC-CBT annex row III.1	
Nam Dinh 1	Hai Hau power station	Taekwang Vina Industry Joint Stock Company, First National Operation & Maintenance Co. (NOMAC)	2×600	permitted	Nam Dinh	2024–2025	MOIT Report 58/BC-CBT annex row IV.4	
Nghi Son 1		EVN Genco No 1	2×300	operating	Thanh Hoa	2013–2014		
Nghi Son 2		Korean Electric Power Corporation and Marubeni Group	2×600	construction	Thanh Hoa	2022	MOIT Report 58/BC-CBT annex row IV.5	
Ninh Binh		Ninh Binh Thermal Power JSC	4×25	operating	Ninh Binh	1974		
Nong Son 1		Vietnam National Coal and Mineral Industries Group	30	operating	Quang Nam	2014		
Pha Lai 1		Pha Lai Thermal Power JSC	4×110	operating	Hai Duong	1986		
Pha Lai 2		Pha Lai Thermal Power JSC	2×300	operating	Hai Duong	2001		
Quang Ninh 1–2		Quang Ninh Thermal Power JSC	2×300	operating	Quang Ninh	2009–2014		
Quang Ninh 3		no investor	2×600	announced	Quang Ninh		MOIT Report 58/BC-CBT annex row VI.4	
Quang Trach 1		Electricity of Vietnam	2×600	permitted	Quang Binh	2022–2023	MOIT Report 58/BC-CBT annex row I.17	
Quang Trach 2		Electricity of Vietnam	2×600	announced	Quang Binh	2026	MOIT Report 58/BC-CBT annex row I.18	
Quang Tri 1		EGAT International (EGATi)	2×660	pre-permit	Quang Tri	2026–2027	MOIT Report 58/BC-CBT annex row IV.11	
Quang Tri 2		Korea Western Power Co	2×600	announced	Quang Tri	2024		
Quynh Lap 1		Vietnam National Coal and Mineral Industries Group	2×600	permitted	Nghe An	2026	MOIT Report 58/BC-CBT annex row III.3	
Quynh Lap 2		POSCO	2×600	announced	Nghe An	2027–2028	MOIT Report 58/BC-CBT annex row IV.14	
Rang Dong cogeneration			100	announced		2025	PDP 7A Decision 428/QD-TTg annex 1 Table 2, "Projects in operation from 2025" row 4	
Son Dong		Vietnam National Coal and Mineral Industries Group	2×110	operating	Bac Giang	2009		
Song Hau 1		PetroVietnam Power Corp	2×600	construction	Hau Giang	2021	MOIT Report 58/BC-CBT annex row II.3	
Song Hau 2		Toyo Engineering & Construction	2×1000	permitted	Hau Giang	2024	MOIT Report 58/BC-CBT annex row IV.7	
Tan Phuoc 1		Electricity of Vietnam	2×600	announced	Tien Giang		MOIT Report 58/BC-CBT annex row I.15	
Tan Phuoc 2		Electricity of Vietnam	2×600	announced	Tien Giang		MOIT Report 58/BC-CBT annex row I.16	
Thai Binh 1		Electricity of Vietnam	2×300	operating	Thai Binh	2017	MOIT Report 58/BC-CBT annex row I.5	
Thai Binh 2		PetroVietnam Power Corp	2×600	construction	Thai Binh	2021–2022	MOIT Report 58/BC-CBT annex row II.1	
Thai Binh 3		Vietnam National Coal and Mineral Industries Group	440	announced	Thai Binh			
Thang Long	Le Loi power station	Hanoi Export-Import Company	2×300	operating	Quang Ninh	2017–2018	MOIT Report 58/BC-CBT annex row V.1	
Uong Bi I extension		EVN Genco No 1	300	operating	Quang Ninh	2007		
Uong Bi I		EVN Genco No 1	50 & 55	operating	Quang Ninh	1975–1976		retired in 2021
Uong Bi II extension		EVN Genco No 1	330	operating	Quang Ninh	2014		
Van Phong 1		Sumitomo Corporation	2×660	permitted	Khanh Hoa	2023–2024	MOIT Report 58/BC-CBT annex row IV.10	
Vedan Vietnam Cogeneration		Vedan Vietnam JSC	60	operating	Dong Nai	2015		
Vinh Tan 1		China Southern Power Grid, Vinacomin	2×600	operating	Binh Thuan	2018–2019	MOIT Report 58/BC-CBT annex row IV.1	
Vinh Tan 2		EVN Genco No 3	2×622	operating	Binh Thuan	2014		
Vinh Tan 3		OneEnergy, EVN, and Pacific Group	3×660	pre-permit	Binh Thuan	2024–2025	MOIT Report 58/BC-CBT annex row IV.9	
Vinh Tan 4 extension	Vinh Tan 4 extension	Electricity of Vietnam	600	construction	Binh Thuan	2019	MOIT Report 58/BC-CBT annex row I.12	
Vinh Tan 4		Electricity of Vietnam	2×600	operating	Binh Thuan	2017–2018	MOIT Report 58/BC-CBT annex row I.6	
Vung Ang 1		PetroVietnam Power Corp	2×600	operating	Ha Tinh	2014–2015		
Vung Ang 2		OneEnergy Co.	2×600	permitted	Ha Tinh	2023–2024	MOIT Report 58/BC-CBT annex row IV.6	
Vung Ang 3		Samsung Construction & Trading Corporation	2×600	shelved	Ha Tinh	2031	MOIT Report 58/BC-CBT annex row IV.13	
Vung Ang 3			2×600	announced			PDP 7A: Reserve power plants for renewable energy power stations' failure of schedule and output expected	

== Notes ==
- Announced: Projects that are in the planning decision of the government or companies but have not yet obtained a permit or permission for land use rights, coal supply rights...
- Pre-permit development: Projects have started to implement one of the following items: environmental licenses, land and water use rights, financial security, transmission contract guarantees, etc.
- Permitted: Projects that have been licensed for environmental licenses but have not yet begun to break ground.
- Construction: Projects are being built after the groundbreaking ceremony.
- Shelved: Projects do not have specific information on the project's progress but do not have enough information to declare the project cancelled.
- Operating: Projects with an official commercial operation date (COD).

== Sources ==
- Boom and Bust 2021: Tracking The Global Coal Plant Pipeline (Report). Global Energy Monitor. 5 April 2021.
