= Ngụy Thị Khanh =

Vietnamese environmental activist

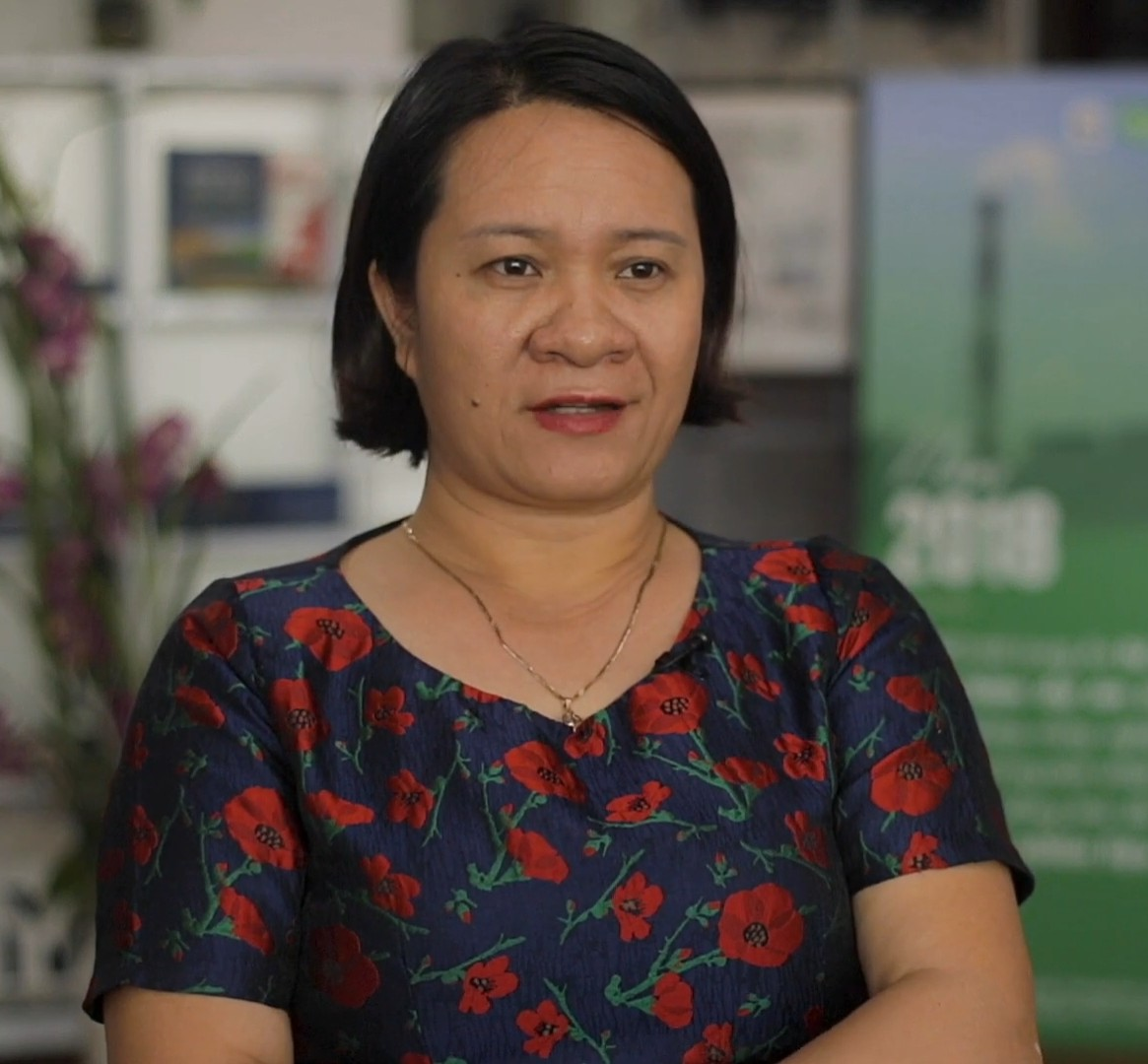
- Ngụy Thị Khanh in 2016
- Born: 1976 (age 49–50); Bắc Am village, Bắc Giang Province, Vietnam
- Occupation: environmental activist
- Years active: 2008–
- Awards: Goldman Environmental Prize (2018)

Ngụy Thị Khanh (born 1976) is a Vietnamese environmentalist who is the executive director, and founder, of the Green Innovation and Development Centre (GreenID) in Vietnam. Khanh is also the advocacy coordinator for the Vietnam Rivers Network (VRN).

== Early life ==
Khanh was born in 1976 in Bắc Am, a village in Bắc Giang Province. She graduated from the Institute of International Relations (Học viện Quan hệ Quốc tế) in Hanoi.

== Environmental activism ==
Since 2008, she has been the coordinator of the advocacy efforts of the Vietnam Rivers Network (VRN), where she initially worked on limiting water pollution from mining activities, and then broadened the emphasis to include other pollution sources and strategic energy policy. In 2011, she established the Green Innovation and Development Centre (GreenID), a science and technology organization which specializes in researching and providing sustainable energy solutions for the community, and actively participates in consulting and giving suggestions in the fields of energy planning, renewable energy, climate change, reduction of fossil energy usage and providing clean water. Khanh was an official observer for Vietnam at the 2015 United Nations Climate Change Conference.

In 2018, she won the Goldman Environmental Prize for her work with Vietnamese governmental agencies developing long-term sustainable energy strategies that reduced dependence on coal power.

== Arrest ==
On 9 February 2022, the Vietnam People's Public Security office in Hanoi issued a decision to prosecute and arrest Khanh for the alleged charges of tax evasion under Article 200 of the Penal Code. After the trial in Hanoi People's Court on 17 June, Khanh was sentenced to two years in prison. Before being arrested and sentenced to prison, Khanh had spoken out against the plan to expand coal power in Vietnam. The prosecution of Khanh, like other climate activists, raised doubts about Prime Minister Pham Minh Chinh's government's commitment to cut coal usage. Her and other activists' arrest also risked derailing a deal aimed at shifting the ninth largest coal consuming country off coal.

=== Reactions to Khanh's arrest ===
On 19 June 2022, at a press briefing, U.S. Department of State spokesperson Ned Price issued a statement calling for the release of Khanh and other climate activists. On 20 June, the Climate Action Network condemned Vietnam's conviction and imprisonment of Khanh, and called for the immediate release of her and other civil society activists detained by the Vietnamese government. Michael Sutton, the executive director of the Goldman Environmental Prize, called Vietnam to release her and stated that the legal charges against her are part of a broader effort to silence climate activists in Vietnam.

On 21 June, in a Facebook post, the British Embassy in Vietnam voiced concern about Khanh's prison sentence, and that the space for civil society organizations in Vietnam to voice opinions and contribute to important issues such as climate change has become limited. On 22 June, the Swiss Embassy in Vietnam also voiced deep concern over Khanh's two-year prison sentence, and called for immediate release of her and other environmental activists, such as Dang Dinh Bach, who also has been convicted by the public security while campaigning for environmental protection and climate change mitigation. On the same day, the Consulate General of Canada in Ho Chi Minh City posted a Facebook post calling for Khanh's release.

On 5 July, in response to the calls for her release, spokesperson for the Ministry of Foreign Affairs of Vietnam Le Thi Thu Hang denied that Khanh's arrest was related to her climate activism, and stated that Khanh had pleaded guilty for tax evasion and her rights had been guaranteed in accordance with the law. She also stated that Vietnam is seriously committed to environmental protection, climate change response, and green and sustainable development, in accordance with the commitment to achieve net-zero emissions by 2050 at the 2021 United Nations Climate Change Conference (COP26), and participation in the Global Coal to Clean Power Transition Statement and the Glasgow Leaders' Declaration on Forests and Land Use.

== See also ==
- Water supply and sanitation in Vietnam
