= Plug-in electric vehicles in Vietnam =

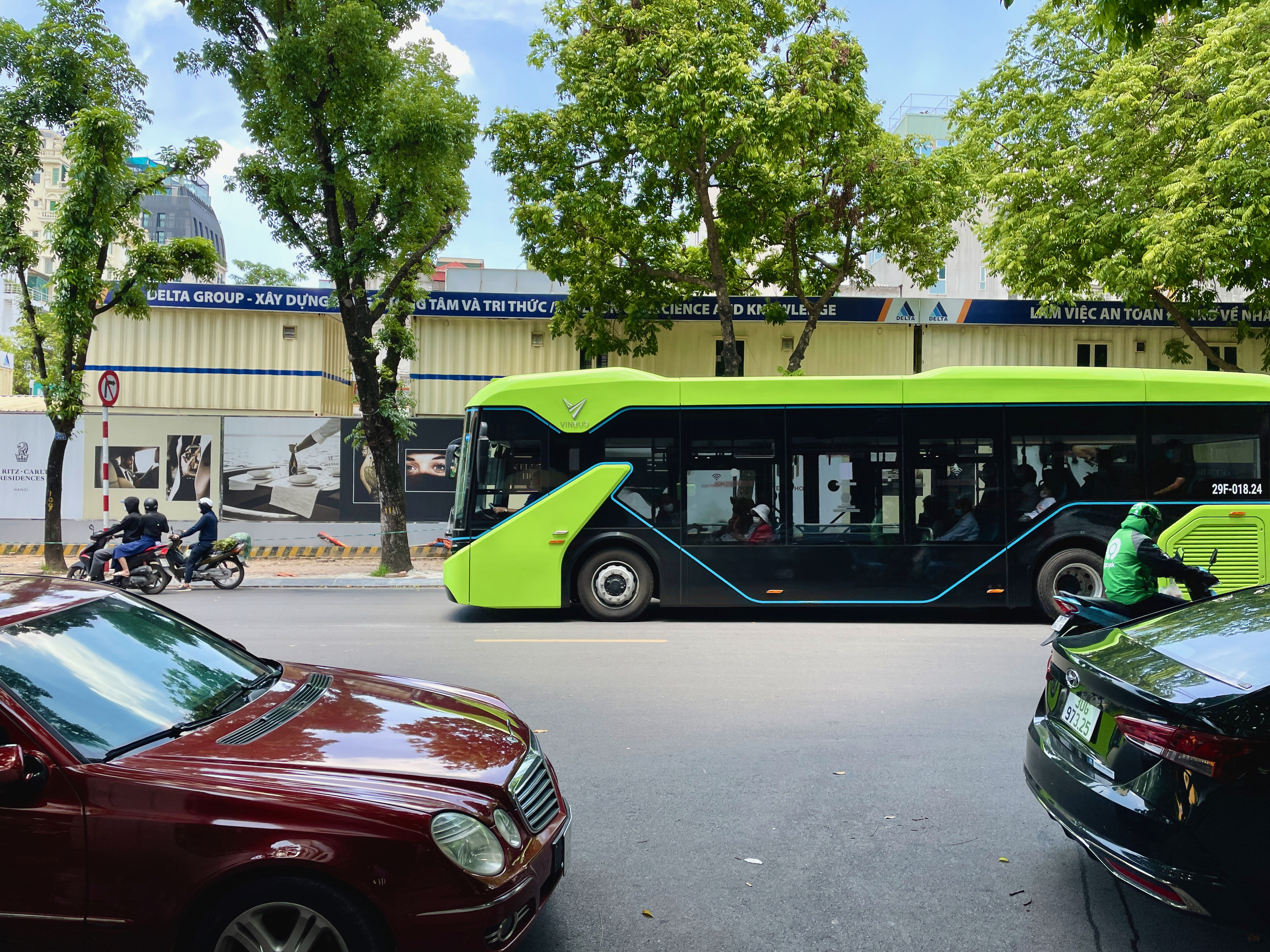
An electric VinFast VinBus in Hanoi, Vietnam

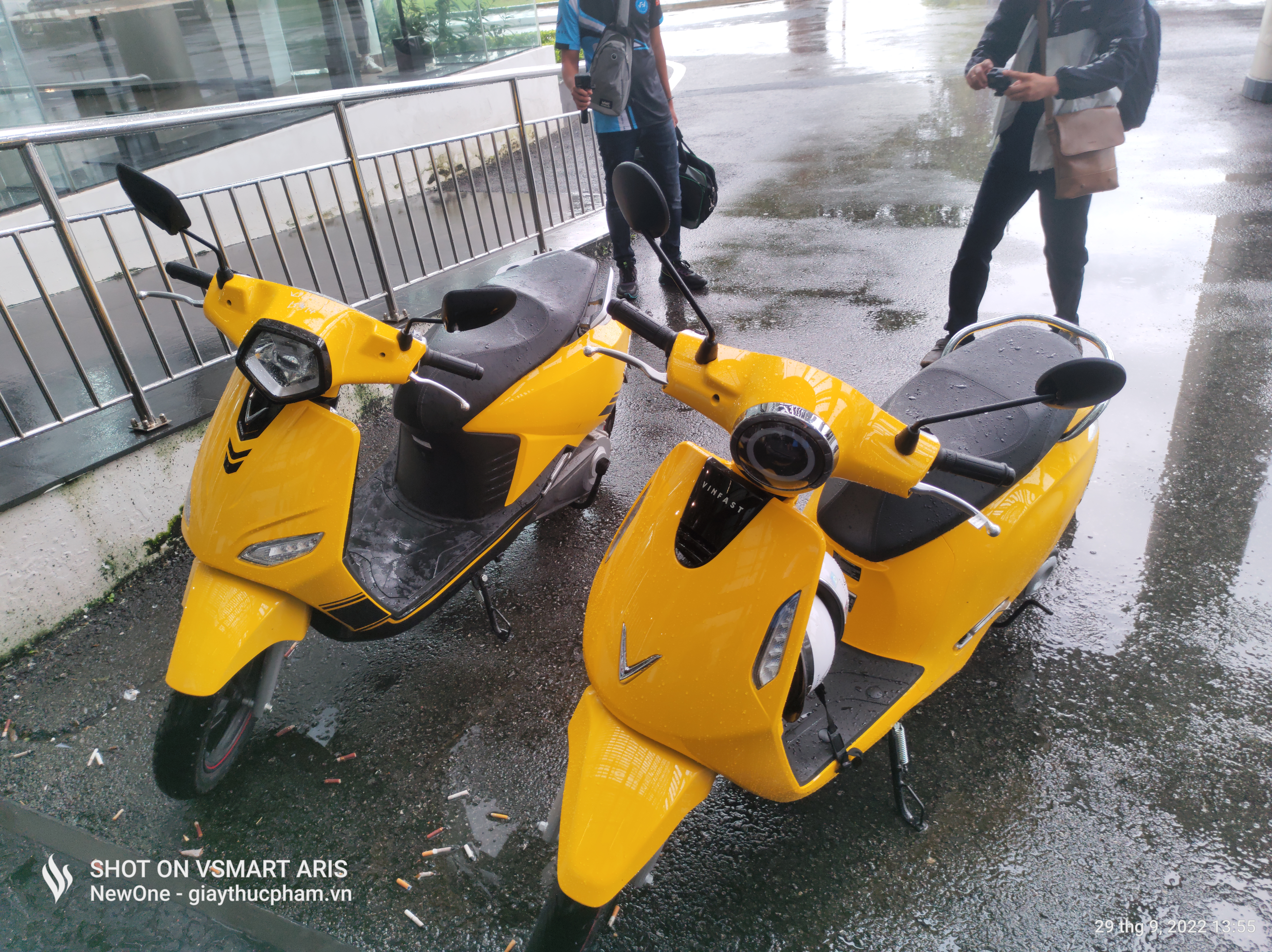
Electric scooters

The manufacture and adoption of electric vehicles have been given preferential treatment by the Vietnamese government in order to reduce vehicle emission pollution. From March 1, 2022, battery powered cars will be exempt from registration fees for 3 years, along with subject to reduced excise taxes.

Total EVs in Vietnam
2019	140
2020	900
2021 (Q1)	600

VinFast, a subsidiary of conglomerate VinGroup, launched the Klara electric scooter in November 2018. In December 2021, the company delivered the VF e34, the first electric automobile to be produced in Vietnam as well as the first EV sold in the country. VinFast announced plans to build a $2 billion electric vehicle factory in North Carolina, with production expected to begin in 2024

Startup Dat Bike launched its Weaver electric motorbike in 2019, and the Weaver 200 in 2021. In February 2021, Modmo e-bikes began shipping to 27 countries from their factory outside Ho Chi Minh City.

VinBus Ecology Transport Services LLC (VinBus), a VinGroup subsidiary, launched Vietnam's first electric bus at Vinhomes Ocean Park, Hanoi, in April 2021. The company aims to manufacture 200-300 electric buses per year over the next few years, to be run on 15 routes in Hanoi, Ho Chi Minh City, and Phu Quoc City.

In March 2022, the first of five trial electric bus lines launched in Ho Chi Minh City. The buses are operated by VinBus, and connect Vinhomes Grand Park in Thu Duc District with District 1's Saigon Bus Station.

Selex Motors launched its Camel electric delivery scooter in 2022.
