= Water supply and sanitation in Vietnam =

Data
- Access to an improved water source: 98% (2015)
- Continuity of supply: 21.6 hours per day on average in 68 cities (2009), often at low pressure
- Average urban water use (L/person/day): 50 (2004 in small towns), 80−130 (2009 in towns and cities)
- Average urban water and sanitation tariff (US$/m^{3}): 0.26 (2009)
- Share of household metering: 96% in cities (2009)
- Annual investment in WSS: US$156 million per year (average 1998−2002), corresponding to less than $2 per capita per year
- Financing: ca. 60% external donors, ca. 25% internal public sources, ca. 15% by users

Institutions
- Decentralization to municipalities: At the provincial level
- National water and sanitation company: No
- Water and sanitation regulator: None
- Responsibility for policy setting: Ministry of Construction (urban areas), Ministry of Agriculture and Rural Development (water supply in rural areas), Ministry of Health (sanitation in rural areas)
- Sector law: None
- No. of urban service providers: 68 Provincial Water Supply Companies and a number of Urban Environmental Companies in the largest cities for sewerage and wastewater treatment
- No. of rural service providers: More than 4,433 (number from 2007 based on a survey in 39 of 58 provinces)

Water supply and sanitation in Vietnam is characterized by challenges and achievements. Among the achievements is a substantial increase in access to water supply and sanitation between 1990 and 2010, nearly universal metering, and increased investment in wastewater treatment since 2007. Among the challenges are continued widespread water pollution, poor service quality, low access to improved sanitation in rural areas, poor sustainability of rural water systems, insufficient cost recovery for urban sanitation, and the declining availability of foreign grant and soft loan funding as the Vietnamese economy grows and donors shift to loan financing. The government also promotes increased cost recovery through tariff revenues and has created autonomous water utilities at the provincial level, but the policy has had mixed success as tariff levels remain low and some utilities have engaged in activities outside their mandate.

== Access ==
In 2015, 98% of the total population in Vietnam had access to "improved" water, or 99% and 97%, for the urban and rural population, respectively. That meant that around 2 million people lacked access to "improved" water at the time. Regarding sanitation, 78% of the population in Vietnam had access to "improved" sanitation, or 94% of the urban population and 70% of the rural population. Still, approximately 21 million people in Vietnam, in 2015, lacked accessed to "improved" sanitation.

According to the UN's Joint Monitoring Programme for Water Supply and Sanitation, access to an improved water source in the country increased from 58% in 1990 to 96% in 2010. However, most Vietnamese receive water from a tap in the yard or a public tap in the village from where they have to carry water to their home. In 2010, only 23% of Vietnamese had a tap in their home. There are substantial differences in access between urban and "rural" areas. 70% of the Vietnamese population lives in rural areas, but many so-called rural areas are actually small towns, e.g. in the densely settled Red River Delta. In urban areas, 59% had a tap in their home, while in rural areas this ratio was only 8%. In 2009 over 200 out of approximately 650 district towns did not have any piped water system.

Access to improved sanitation increased from 37% in 1990 to 75% in 2011. There is a significant gap between urban areas, where access stands at 93%, and rural areas with an access of only 67%. In 2009, 75% of households in provincial towns were not connected to a sewer. Septic tanks are common, but with the exception of Hai Phong, no town offers a reasonable desludging service.

== Water resources ==
Vietnam has abundant surface and ground water resources. Nevertheless, local shortages can occur during the dry season. For example, the basins of the Dong Nai River in South Vietnam, the Southeast River Cluster, Ma River in North Central Vietnam, Kone River and Huong River are expected to be at risk of exceeding projected water needs in 2020.

The 7 million people in Ho Chi Minh City receive 95% of their drinking water from two treatment plants on the Dong Nai River and the much smaller Sai Gon River, with the remaining 7% coming from overexploited groundwater that is polluted by seawater intrusion and contamination. Dong Nai River, which is regulated further upstream by two dams, has ample water resources to supply the growing city with more water. However, in dry years drinking water supply competes with agricultural uses that may together exceed water availability.

Hanoi with its more than 6 million inhabitants receives 80% of its water from groundwater. Groundwater is polluted by ammonium with a concentration that is 5 to 10 times (7–20 mg/L) higher than the allowed standard. Surface water comes from the Gia Lam plant completed in 1994 and the Thang Long North-Van Tri plant completed in 2004, both financed by Japanese development assistance. It is planned that surface water from the Da River, the Red River and the Duong River will satisfy the growing water demand in the future and gradually replace the existing ground water. During the dry season in 2013 several districts of Hanoi went completely without water. A transmission pipeline from the existing plant on the Da River suffered numerous breaks, exacerbating water scarcity. The Vietnamese company Vinaconex built the pipeline with fibreglass-reinforced pipes that it manufactured itself using. With anti-Chinese sentiment riding high in Vietnam, the faults have been blamed on the perceived low-cost Chinese technology behind the manufacturing process. When a Chinese firm won a contract to build a second pipeline in 2016, the government cancelled the contract.

== Service quality ==
=== Drinking water quality ===
In early 2009 tests by the Vietnam Institute of Biotechnology showed widespread contamination of municipal tap water, including high levels of e-coli. Most residents boil drinking water, because they do not trust the quality of the tap water, or use bottled water. Some tap water samples were also contaminated with ammonia at levels that were 6–18 times higher than the allowed level. Ammonia in drinking water is not a direct health risk, but it can compromise disinfection efficiency, cause the failure of some filters, and it causes taste and odor problems. Arsenic levels were two to three times higher than acceptable according to the World Health Organization guidelines. Bacteria were also found in bottled water samples, according to analyses by the Ho Chi Minh City health department in 2009, leading to 38 water bottling firms being ordered closed.

=== Pollution and wastewater treatment ===
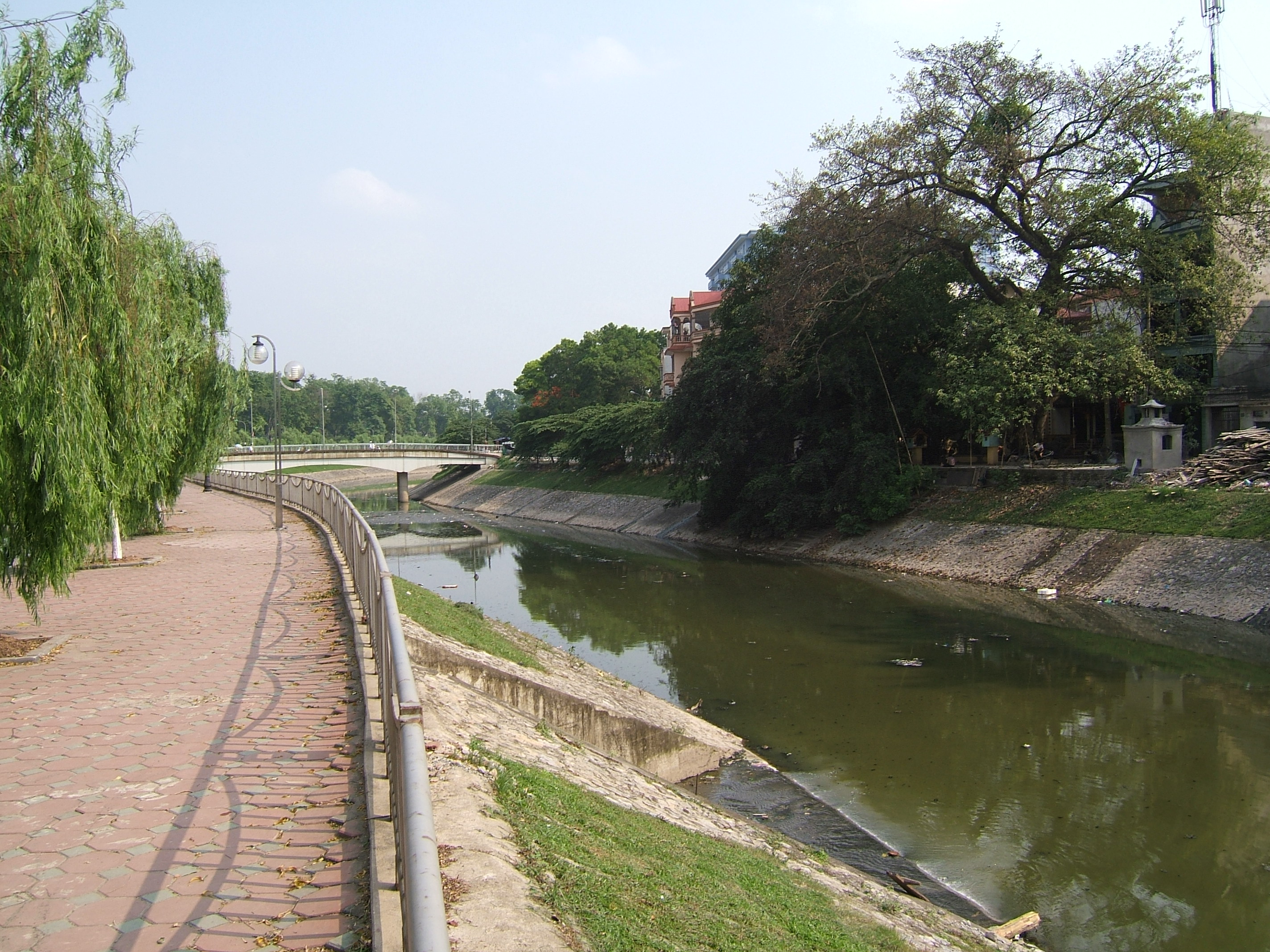
98 percent of rivers and lakes in Hanoi do not meet water quality standards.

Water pollution is a serious issue in Vietnam as a result of rapid industrialization and urbanization without adequate environmental management. As of 2008 only 10 percent of municipal wastewater was treated, and only 45% of industrial zones were expected to have wastewater treatment of some kind in 2010. The pollution of rivers and lakes in Hanoi is "alarming" according to municipal authorities, as up to 98 per cent of 200 rivers and lakes fail to meet the required water quality. Sewer systems consist of combined sewers, channeling both rainwater and municipal sewage. Small enterprises engaged in food processing and textile dyeing in so-called "craft villages", of which there are 700 in the Red River Delta alone, discharge untreated wastewater. An analysis by the University of Technologies and the Ministry of Science and Technology showed that 100% of wastewater samples taken from craft villages exceed allowed levels of pollution. Vietnam also has more than 200 registered industrial zones without sustainable wastewater treatment. Industrial zones discharge 1 million cubic meters of untreated sewage per day, about 70 percent of all industrial wastewater. 8 industrial zones will be equipped with wastewater treatment plants with the help of a US$50 million loan from the World Bank approved in 2012. It is also planned to construct 30 wastewater treatment plants in the Mekong Delta until 2020, including 13 plants for domestic wastewater treatment and 17 for industrial wastewater treatment in Can Tho, a Giang, Kien Giang and Ca Mau provinces. In 2012 Hanoi expected to start the operation of the upgraded Yen So waste water treatment plant with a design capacity of 200,000 cubic meters per day; eight more wastewater treatment plants are planned in Hanoi alone.

== Responsibility for water supply and sanitation ==
=== Responsibility for policy setting ===
Within the national government responsibility for water supply and sanitation is shared between three Ministries. Urban water supply and sewerage is under the Ministry of Construction. Rural water supply is under the Ministry of Agriculture and Rural Development, while rural sanitation and hygiene are under the Ministry of Health. The structure of Ministries is mirrored at the provincial level, where each Ministry has branches. The 58 provinces have considerable autonomy in implementing policies. For example, some focus on public sector service provision, while others − especially in the South - promote the private sector.

=== National policies and targets ===
The government policy is to achieve full cost recovery for water supply and partial cost recovery for urban sanitation. Decree 117/2007 requires water supply tariffs to be set to full cost recovery and Decree 88/2007 requires sanitation to be charged through a surcharge of the water tariff at a minimum of 10% to achieve recovery of the operation and maintenance costs. In 2009 the government introduced the policy of “socialization” or “equitization” of water supply companies through Prime Minister Instruction 854/2009. The policy is a byword for creating financially autonomous utilities that would ultimately be able to borrow from commercial banks.

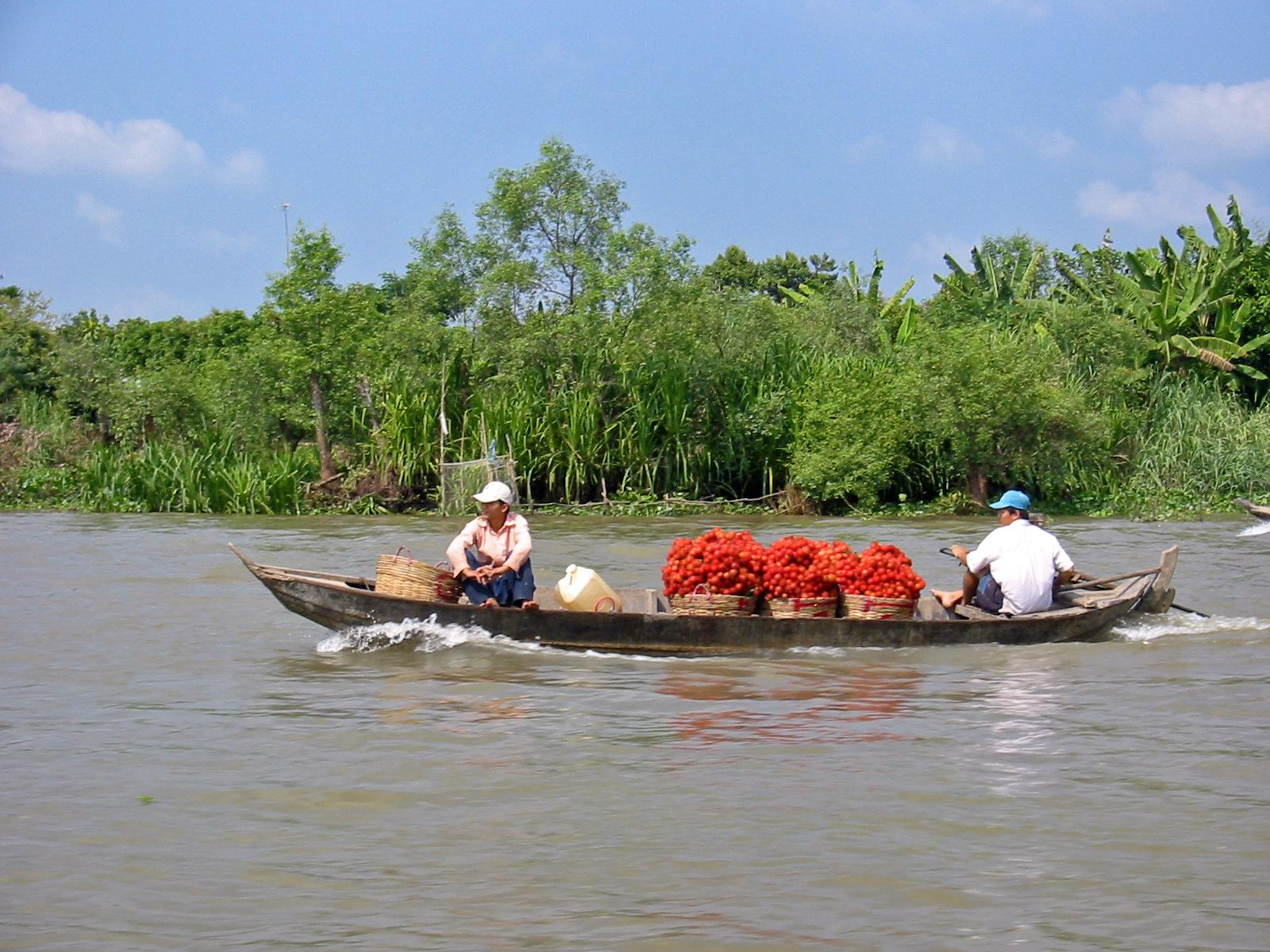
A National Strategy aims to increase access to clean water in rural Vietnam, such as here in the Mekong Delta where water in canals is abundant, but not drinkable without treatment.

The government aims at providing 90% of the urban population with access to safe drinking water and at collecting and treating 100% of the urban wastewater by 2020. The latter goal had been set for 2010 as part of the Vietnam Development Goals, but only 10% of urban wastewater was treated as of 2008 according to the Ministry of Construction. Furthermore, the government aims at reducing non-revenue water to 15% by 2020, to provide 120–-150 liters of water per capita per day, and to make water companies financially self-sustaining by 2025. The latter target had also been set for 2010, but was missed.

There is a National Strategy for Rural Clean Water Supply and Sanitation that was approved in 2000, which emphasizes a demand-responsive approach, meaning that users should take important decisions such as the most appropriate technology and the model of service provision.

=== Policy implementation and monitoring ===
The "equitization" was completed in 2010, but – unlike the central government intended – the provincial governments used water utilities to engage in lucrative real estate deals. Provincial and local governments are reluctant to raise tariffs in line with government policies, and the sanitation surcharge is often insufficient to recover even operating costs, leaving local governments with the burden to subsidize the operating costs of wastewater companies. Tariffs were thus barely increased and the level of cost recovery remains lowest, especially for wastewater. The Asian Development Bank concluded in 2010:

"(the) government's intention to privatize water companies through the gradual process of equitization has not yet had the impact that may have been intended. Private ownership of a share of the system assets was not backed up by clearly defined and verifiable performance indicators (...) The process to date has been characterized by a loss of management control, with no (short-term) benefit to either consumers or (potentially, in the long term) to the condition of the system's assets. Instead, the equitization of water and wastewater companies is providing these companies with a Business License and a de facto authorization to grow outside their areas of core competence, posing a major threat to service delivery, due to a lack of proper regulation and control."

There is no meaningful monitoring system for the sector goals. The sector goals concerning access to drinking water and sanitation are not defined in terms of the definition of the UN's Joint Monitoring Programme for Water Supply and Sanitation, which is considered too loose, but in terms of a more narrow definition of access. There is a large number of performance criteria, but there are no baseline data and no methodology for monitoring. There may even be a disincentive for provinces to improve their monitoring systems, since it is in their interest to show that their access figures are low and that they are in need of more central funds.

In rural areas decision-making often remains top-down, with little or no meaningful participation by users. For example, in some provinces in Central Vietnam piped water supply with meters is provided at high costs, while users continue to use water that comes in hose pipes from nearby sources, because it is cheaper and is considered of better quality. The Asian Development Bank concludes:

Local capacity for operation and maintenance (...) is lacking. Capacity building and monitoring and evaluation (...) have proven inadequate so far. Commune People's Committees are supposed to guide the establishment of management boards for water supply and sanitation but members (...) lack the skills needed to carry out their tasks (...) households are either reluctant or unable to pay for water supply (...) after schemes have been built, people either do not use them at all or use them sparingly, supplementing them with water from unimproved sources, resulting in an unintended overcapacity of schemes themselves.

=== Responsibility for service provision ===
Water supply and sanitation in Vietnam is the responsibility of numerous categories of service providers, with substantial differences in the categories of service providers between urban and rural areas.

==== Urban areas ====
Water supply in cities and some larger towns is provided by state-owned provincial Water Service Companies (WSCs). Provincial WSCs have evolved from a centralized national water supply organization during the 1990s. Their autonomy is still limited. Key decisions such as budgets, staff salary and benefits, and senior management appointments require approval by the provincial government. Assets are owned by the province, not the WSC. There is no contractual relationship between the Province and the WSC. Some WSCs are Public Service Enterprises (PSEs), while others have converted to private-law enterprises on the basis of the Enterprise Law. Some WSCs only operate the water systems, while others also design or even build them. Some even manufacture equipment. Some WSC are active outside their geographical jurisdiction.

Sewerage and wastewater treatment in cities is the responsibility of Provincial Urban Environmental Companies. In some provinces they provide only sewerage and wastewater treatment, while in others they have many other responsibilities such as solid waste collection, and again in other provinces WSCs are also in charge of sewerage.

Private sector participation in urban water supply is limited to Build-Operate-Transfer (BOT) contracts for drinking water treatment plants. In Ho Chi Minh City (HCMC), a Malaysian firm has been operating the Binh An plant since 1994. The Thu Duc 2 treatment plant in HCMC and a raw water pumping station supplying water to Ha Noi, including a transmission main from Hoa Binh, are owned and operated by Joint Stock Companies.

==== Rural areas ====
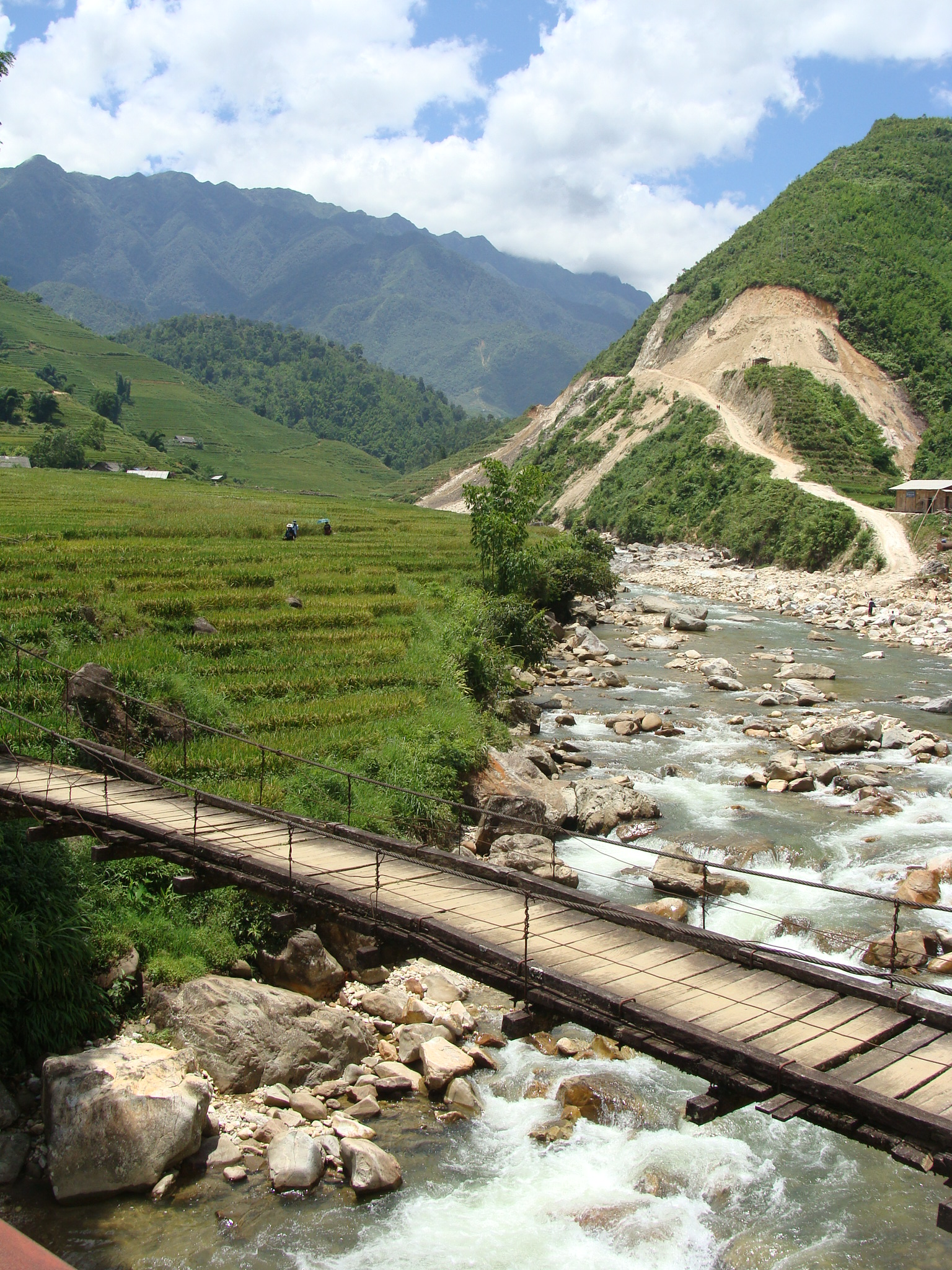
In rural areas of Vietnam piped water systems are operated by a wide variety of institutions including a national organization, people committees (local government), community groups, cooperatives and private companies.

In small towns and rural areas there are six service models:

- operated by the provincial branch of the National Center for Rural Water Supply and Sanitation CERWASS (41% of schemes)
- Direct management by town-level People's Committee (24% of schemes);
- Community management (23% of schemes, mostly of small size);
- Agricultural Cooperatives (4%);
- Other state-owned enterprises, mainly consisting of district water supply companies and/or environmental service companies (1%);
- Private water companies (3%).

A 2007 survey by CERWASS in 39 provinces inventoried 4,433 piped water schemes, finding that those operated by CERWASS were best operated and maintained (62% classified as "good"), compared to those operated by people committees (38%) and communities (25%).

Most early private water systems were built and financed by local residents and water tariffs are high. Since 2007 private water companies began operating larger water systems, such as in Lim Town, with a total population of approximately 12,500, and Minh Duc Town, with a total population of 11,700, under competitively awarded 10-year lease contracts with the provincial water company. These contracts introduced a new service provision model to small towns in Vietnam.

The National Center for Rural Water Supply and Sanitation (CERWASS) and its provincial branch offices provides grant financing, requiring a user contribution, and organizes the construction of infrastructure. It also still operates water systems, although it is supposed to withdraw from this function. A World Bank study of rural water supply service delivery models in 2010 showed that there have been limited efforts to create the institutional framework necessary for sustainable service provision, that up to 90% of wells drilled are not operational and that "a large part of systems break down completely or need major repair within 3-4 years", partly due to poor quality construction. A 2007 survey showed a slightly better picture. It found that out of 4,433 piped water schemes 41% were well operated and maintained, 35% had "medium" operation and maintenance, and 24% had poor or no operation and maintenance.

== Efficiency ==
According to a national urban water benchmarking system set up by the Viet Nam Water Supply and Sewerage Association (VWSA) with the support for the Asian Development Bank, non-revenue water is reported by provincial water companies as having been reduced from 39% in 2000 to around 30% in 2009 on average. However, VWSA itself questions the reliability of these figures. In some cities, non-revenue water is as high as 75%. The government says it wants to reduce non-revenue water to 25% by 2015 and 15% by 2025.

== Financial aspects ==
=== Investment and financing ===
Between 1992 and 2002 about US$1 billion ($100 million per year) was invested in urban water supply and sanitation, out of which US$ 838m was financed by external donors. In rural areas, between 1999 and 2002 a total of VND 3.160 billion ($225 million, corresponding to $56 million per year) was invested, out of which VND 1,460 billion (46%) was financed by users themselves, VND 1300 billion (41%) by the government and “other sources”, and only VND 400 million (13 percent) by donors. The total investment of USD 156m per year corresponds to less than 2 USD per capita and year.

=== Tariff levels and adjustment ===
Urban water tariffs are set by the executive branch of each province, the Provincial People’s Committees, after the Provincial Water Supply Company (WSC) submits their tariff proposal. Often the People’s Committees obtain the consent of the legislative branch, the People's Council. Tariffs are reviewed annually. A 1999 circular 03/1999 said that local government must gradually increase water tariffs to fully recover costs. Implementation has been slow at first, but it sped up when in 2004 the Ministry of Finance and the Ministry of Construction issued a joint circular stipulating the common tariff framework for the whole country, including rural areas. In 2003 residential urban water tariffs were typically in the range VND 1600 to 2700/m3, with an average of VND 2,181/m3 (US$0.15/m3). According to another source, the average water tariff for all user categories - residential, commercial and others - was $0.26/m3 in 2009. Where water consumption is metered, increasing-block tariffs are applied. The second block of the tariff often starts at a low level of consumption. For example, in HCMC it starts at 4 cubic meters per month. However, connection fees are high, especially in small towns, and – according to the World Bank - were “a major obstacle to achieving greater coverage of water supply services” in 2005.

Sewer tariffs did not exist until the early 2000s and have only been introduced gradually. In HCMC the sewer tariff was only 10 percent of the water tariff, far below the actual cost of sewerage and wastewater treatment.

Cooperatives and community-based water supply systems in small towns set their own water tariffs, which are then approved by the Provincial People’s Committee. In rural areas, water is typically not being charged for.

=== Cost recovery and affordability ===
In 2004, all WSC except two recovered their operating costs from tariff revenues. The average operating cost coverage ratio was 168% in 2009. There is no information on cost recovery in small towns and rural areas.

Water bills for those connected are below 2 percent of household expenditures. In slums, residents often cannot connect to the public water system since they are not formally registered. They are forced to buy water from households with connections at a price that is 2−8 times higher than the water tariff.

== External cooperation ==
The main external donors in water supply and sanitation in Vietnam are the Asian Development Bank and Japan, followed by the World Bank and Germany. In rural areas four smaller donor − Australia, Denmark, the UK and the Netherlands − have joined forces to provide budget support for a national program.

=== Germany ===
Germany promotes sustainable sanitation through a wastewater management program that involves technical cooperation and financial cooperation. The program ran from 2005 to 2014. It has influenced the national regulatory framework for sanitation through waste water management Decree 88/2007 enacted by the Prime Minister and a corresponding circular enacted in 2009 by the Ministry of Construction. Furthermore, it supports Provincial People's Committees and wastewater companies in nine provinces through the elaboration of corporate development plans and the financing of sewers and wastewater treatment plants. These are Lang Son, Son La, Hoa Binh, Bac Ninh and Hai Duong in the North, Vinh in the Centre, as well as Tra Vinh, Soc Trang and Can Tho in the Mekong Delta. In 2010 the province of Soc Trang has been the first to enact a sewer tariff that is designed to recover the costs of operation and maintenance. In 2012 Bac Ninh introduced a sewer tariff that is designed to recover half the operation and maintenance costs, with the aim of fully recovering them in 2014. The program also supports information campaigns to increase environmental and health awareness.

=== Japan ===
JICA supports "water environment improvement" in the provinces Thừa Thiên–Huế and Đồng Nai. In Bình Dương, near Ho Chi Minh City, JICA provides a low-interest loan of almost 20 billion Yen (US$170 million) for a sewer system and measures to conserve the city's source of drinking water.

=== World Bank ===
The World Bank provides support through 12 projects approved between 1997 and 2013 with a total lending of more than US$1 billion. One of them is the Red River Delta rural water supply and sanitation projects that promoted participatory approaches through the creation of joint-stock companies.

The World Bank-administered Global Partnership for Output-Based Aid (GPOBA) supports public-private partnerships for water supply in 75 villages in Central Vietnam through a US$4.5 million grant for the East Meets West Foundation.

=== Asian Development Bank ===
In February 2011 the ADB approved a $1bn 10year-facility for water supply in seven or more cities. In December 2015 the ADB approved a loan to expand a water treatment plant on the Da River to supply Hanoi with drinking water, replacing contaminated groundwater that is currently used to supply the city's residents. The loan proceeds will also be used to connect households west of the city along the transmission line from the Da River to Hanoi. However, in 2016 the Hanoi People's Committee awarded a licence to build another water treatment plant on the Duong River west of the city in an area without a distribution network. The licence was awarded without bidding, using a legal loophole that allows to bypass competitive bidding that is prescribed in a decree on Public-Private Partnerships (PPP) passed as recently as 2015. The private company that received the license is Vietnam-Oman Investment Company (VOI) – a joint venture of the State General Reserve Fund of Oman, State Capital Investment Corporation of Vietnam, state-owned technology enterprise Newtatco, VietinBank Capital, and the Hanoi Water Limited Company (Hawacom).
