= Selex Motors =

Selex Smart Electric Vehicle Joint Stock Company
- Founded: 2018
- Headquarters: Hanoi, Vietnam

Selex Motors is a Vietnamese electric moped manufacturer and battery-swapping platform. Founded in 2018 by Nguyen Huu Phuoc Nguyen, Nguyen Trong Hai, and Nguyen Dinh Quang, the company currently operates 30 swapping stations across Vietnam.

The company launched its first electric delivery scooter model, the Selex Camel, in 2022.

United States Secretary of the Treasury Janet L. Yellen visited the Selex Motors factory on July 20, 2023.
