= Phả Lại Power Station =

Power station in Vietnam

Pha Lai Power Plant
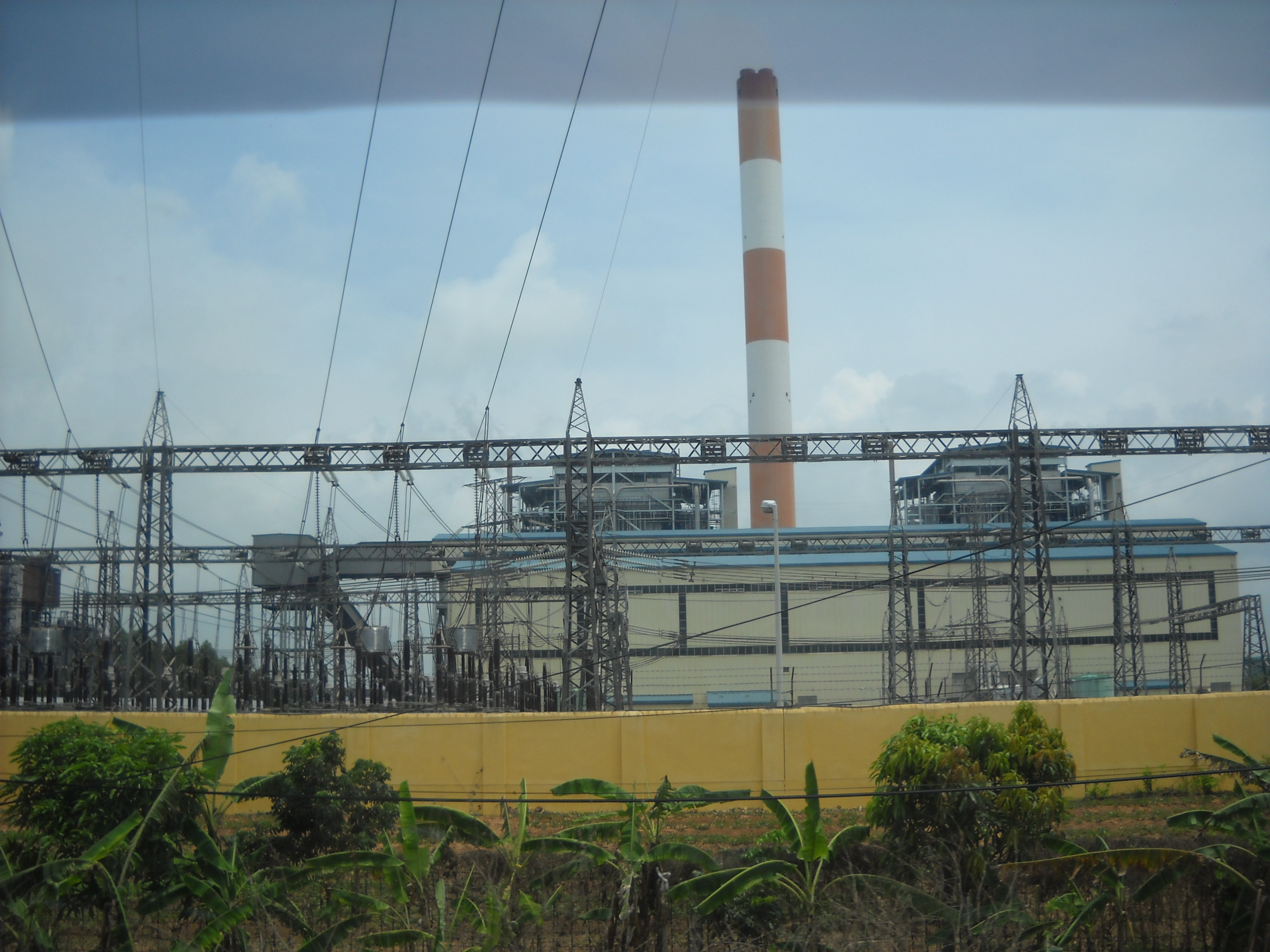
- Country: Vietnam
- Location: Pha Lai
- Coordinates: 21.1155°N 106.309°E
- Status: Operational
- Construction began: 1980
- Commission date: 1983 (Pha Lai I); 2001 (Pha Lai II)
- Owner: Vietnam Electricity
- Operator: Pha Lai Thermal Power

Thermal power station
- Primary fuel: Anthracite

Power generation
- Units operational: 4 X 110 MW (Pha Lai I); 2 X 300 MW (Pha Lai II)
- Make and model: General Electric
- Nameplate capacity: 1,040 MW

Pha Lai Thermal Power Plant is the largest coal-fired power plant in Vietnam located in Pha Lai, Chí Linh District, Hải Dương Province, roughly 65 kilometres (40 mi) north-east of Hanoi. It has an installed electric capacity of 1,040 MW. Pha Lai 1 was fully financed and built with the Russian money and experts.

Construction of the 440-MW first plant started on 17 May 1980 and it was completed in 1986. It consists of four 110-MW turbines and eight boilers. Construction of the 600-MW second plant started on 8 June 1998 and it was completed in 2001 by Lilama Construction Company. It consist of two 300-MW units with Mitsui Babcock Energy designed natural circulation boilers and General Electric generators.
