= Thu Duc station =

Metro station in Ho Chi Minh City, Vietnam

Coordinates: 10.8464°N 106.7716°E

L1 11 Thu Duc Thủ Đức
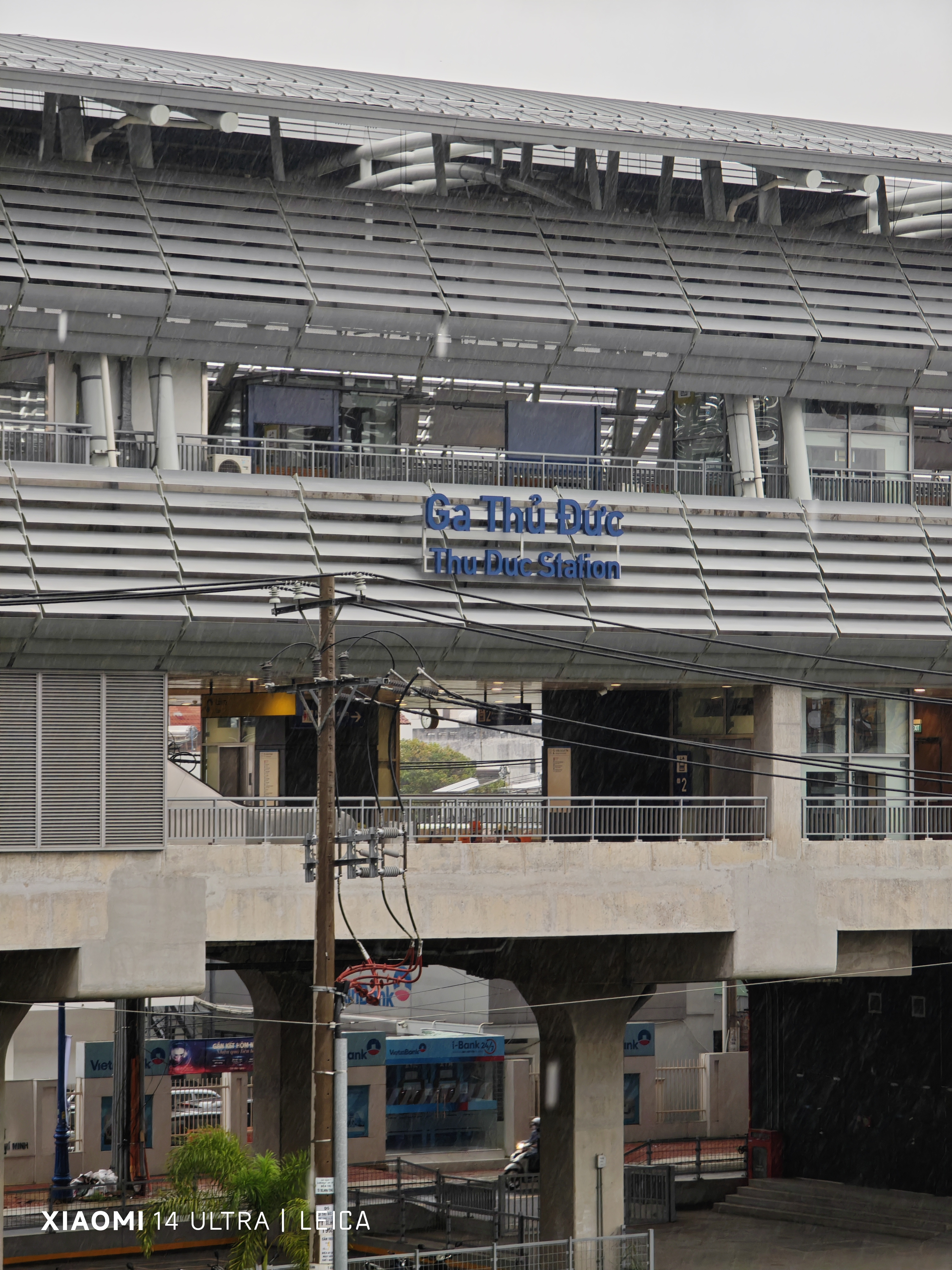

General information
- Location: Bình Thọ, Thủ Đức, Ho Chi Minh City, Vietnam
- System: Ho Chi Minh City Metro station
- Line: L1
- Tracks: 2

Construction
- Structure type: Elevated
- Parking: Yes (motorbike only)

Other information
- Status: Operational
- Station code: L1-11

History
- Opened: 22 December 2024

Services
Preceding station	Ho Chi Minh City Metro	Following station
Binh Thai L1 10 towards Ben Thanh	Line 1	High Tech Park L1 12 towards Suoi Tien Terminal
Route map
Location

Thu Duc station (Vietnamese: Ga Thủ Đức) is an elevated Ho Chi Minh City Metro station on Line 1. Located in Bình Thọ quarter, Thủ Đức, Ho Chi Minh City, the station opened on 22 December 2024.

== Station layout ==
2F; Platform	Side platform, doors will open on the right
2F; Platform	Platform 1	← L1 Line 1 to Binh Thai (for Ben Thanh)
2F; Platform	Platform 2	L1 Line 1 to High Tech Park (for Suoi Tien Terminal) →
2F; Platform	Side platform, doors will open on the right
1F	1st Floor	Ticket sales area, commercial area, technical department area, platform gates & ticket gates
GF	Ground Floor	Entrances/Exits and technical department area

== Surrounding area ==
The station is located at the historical downtown and the busiest intersection of Thủ Đức

- STAR 39 Hotel by Saigontourist
- Hotel 177 by Thuductourist, a partner of Saigontourist,
- Hotel 126 by Thuductourist
- Hotel 204 by Thuductourist
- Health Club 179 by Thuductourist
- Original University Village, Bình Thọ Ward - One of the historical, cultural, scenic and preserved relics of the city)
- Thủ Đức City Party Committee
- Thủ Đức City Department of Education and Training
- Ho Chi Minh City University of Technology and Education
- Thủ Đức College of Technology (Thủ Đức Lasan Mossard School)
- Lê Quý Đôn Secondary School (Thủ Đức, differs to the one in District 3)
- Nguyễn Hữu Huân High School (Originally Thủ Đức High School) vi
- Thủ Đức High School
- Thủ Đức Market
- Thủ Đức Central Post
- Thủ Đức One Pillar Pagoda (The Southern remake of One Pillar Pagoda in Hanoi)
- Thủ Đức Children's House
- Thủ Đức Youth Village
- Thủ Đức Cultural House
- Thủ Đức Sports Center
- Co.op Mart Hanoi Highway
- Vincom Plaza Thủ Đức
- King Crown Infinity Apartment (Under construction)
- Vinamilk - Thống Nhất Factory
- Thủ Đức Water Supply Company vi

== Gallery ==
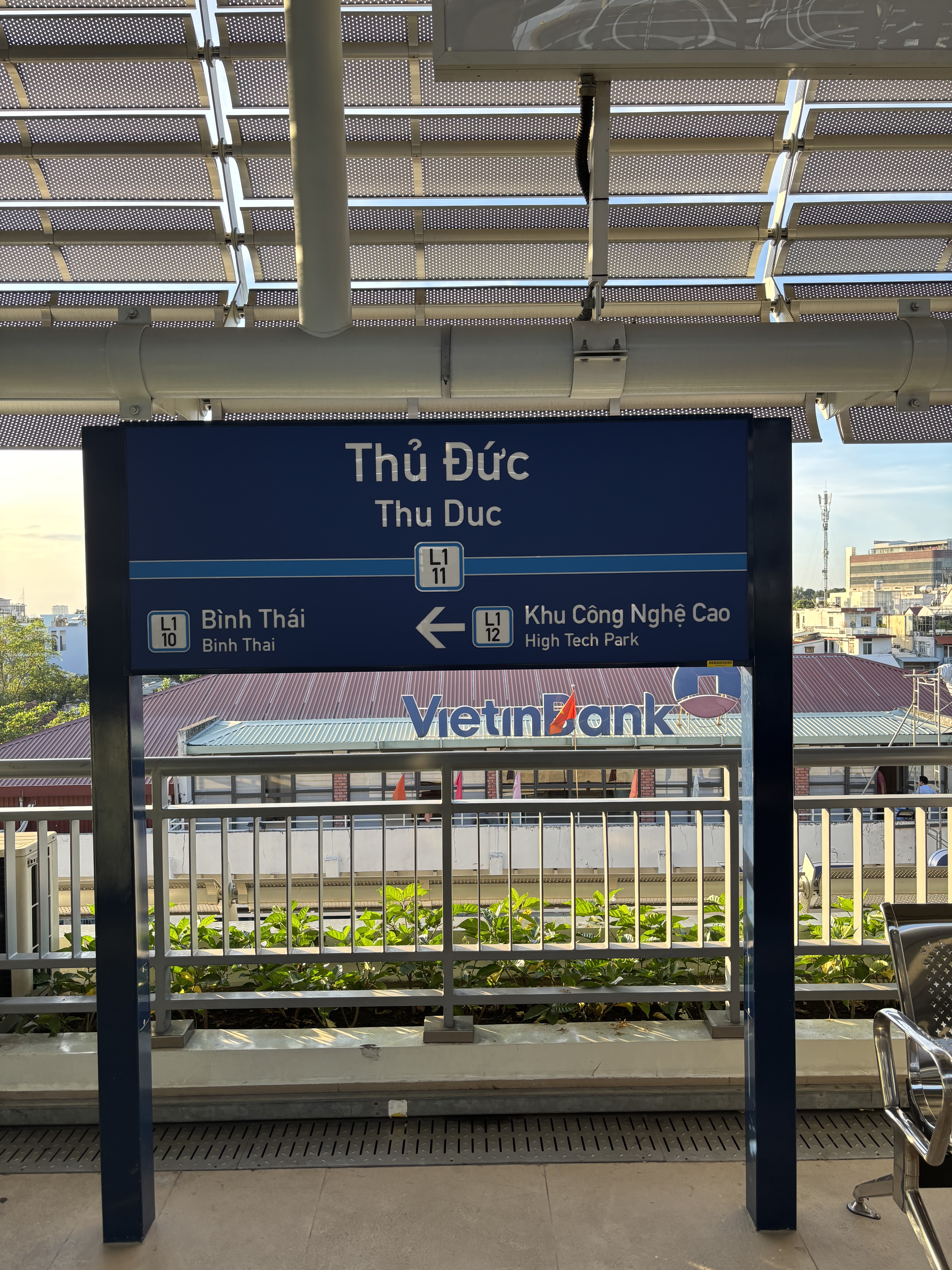
Sign of station name and number with preceding and following stations

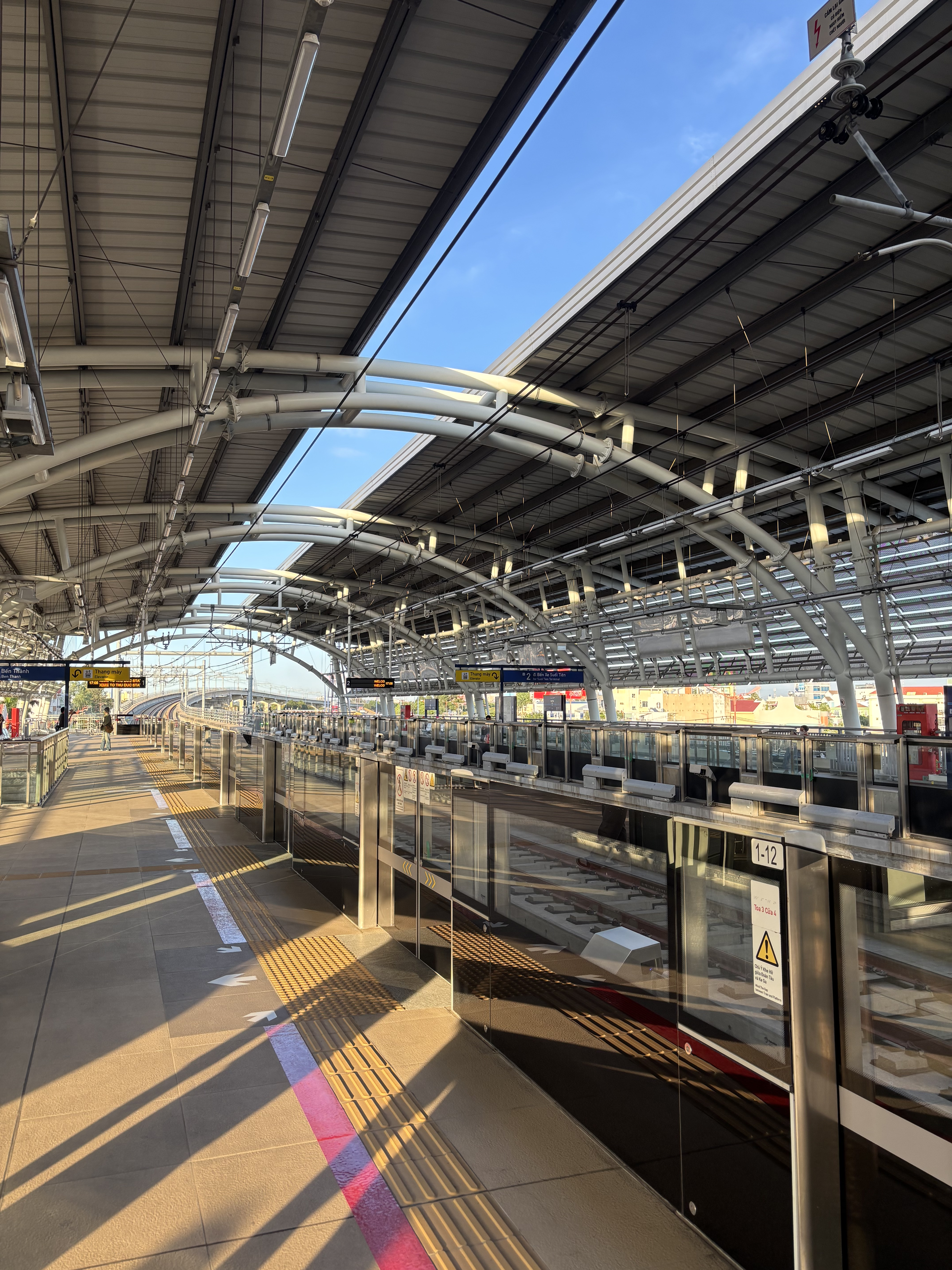
Platform

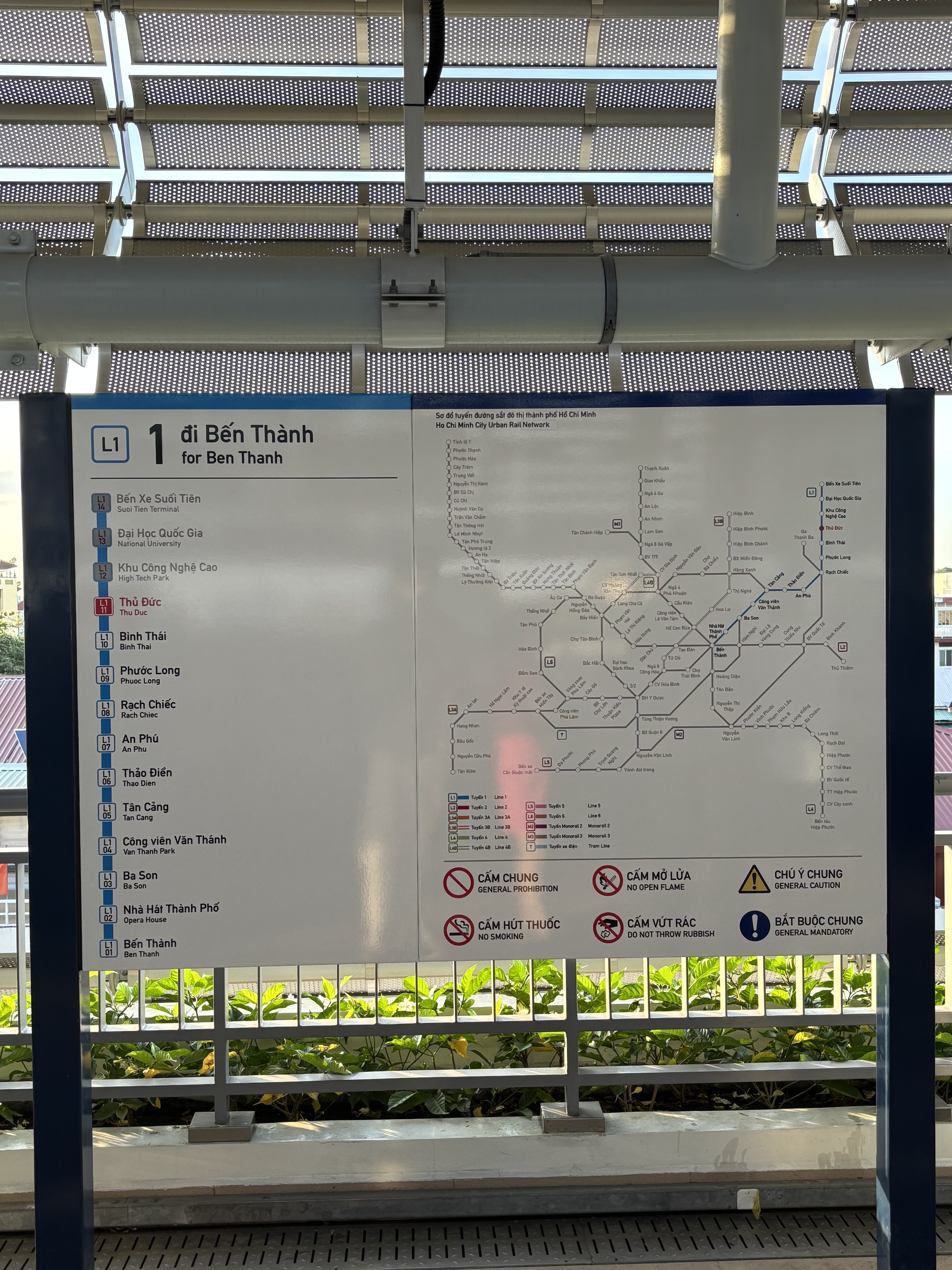
Sign of Line 1 Route and fully network

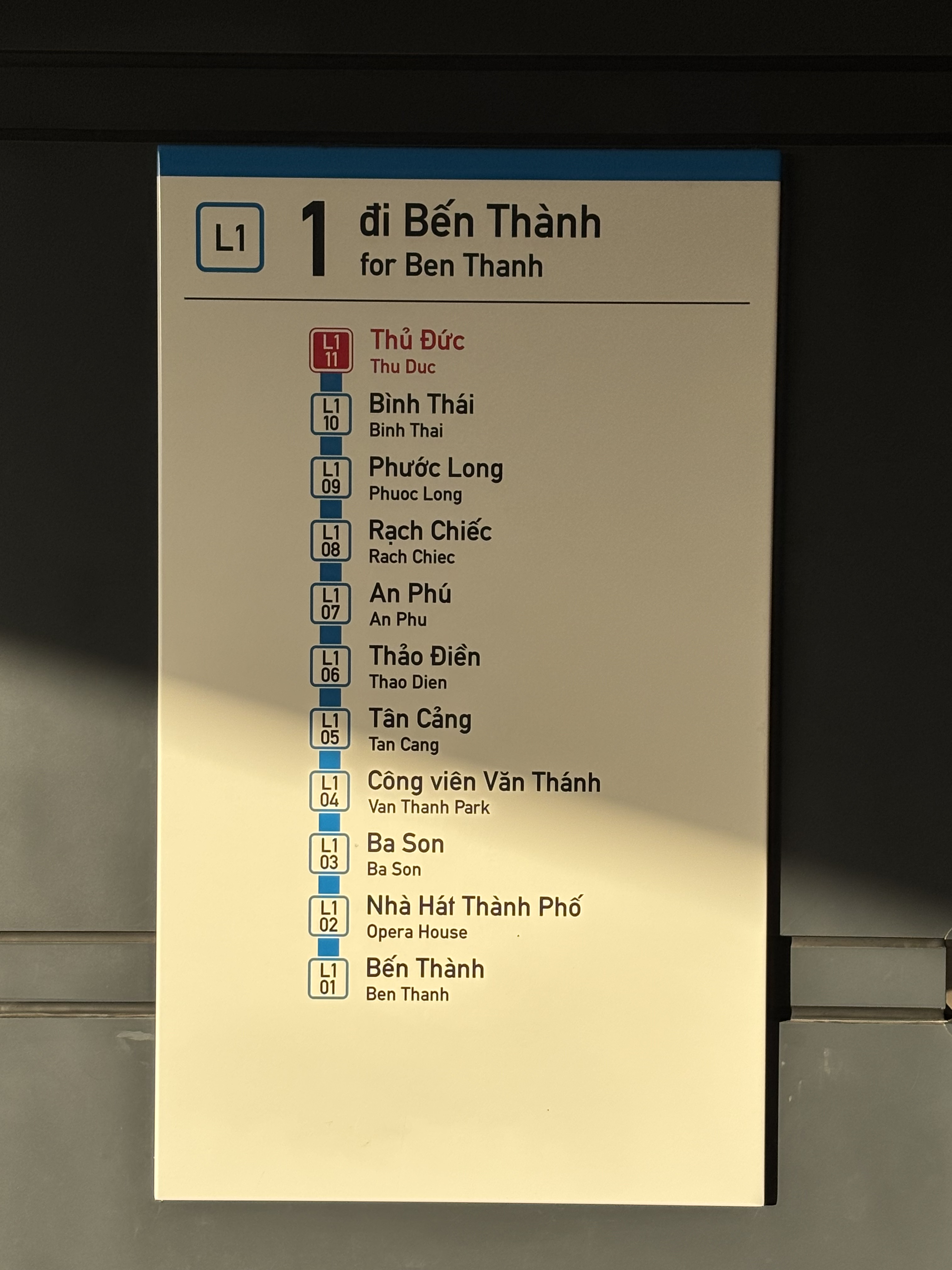
Sign of Ho Chi Minh City Metro Line 1 Route with current station is on the top and painted in pink
