= Phú Quốc light rail transit =

Light rail line under construction on Phú Quốc, Vietnam

Phú Quốc light rail

Overview
- Native name: Tuyến tàu điện đô thị Phú Quốc
- Status: Under construction
- Locale: Phú Quốc, An Giang province, Vietnam
- Termini: Phú Quốc International Airport; APEC Convention and Exhibition Centre
- Stations: 6

Service
- Type: Light rail
- Depot: Near Hà Nội station
- Rolling stock: 14 three-car CRRC Dalian trainsets on order

History
- Opened: August 2027 (planned)

Technical
- Line length: 17.59 km (10.93 mi)
- Number of tracks: 2
- Character: At grade, elevated and underground
- Track gauge: 1,435 mm (4 ft 8 1/2 in)
- Electrification: 1,500 V DC overhead line
- Operating speed: 100 km/h (62 mph)

The Phú Quốc light rail (Vietnamese: Tuyến tàu điện đô thị Phú Quốc) is a light rail line under construction on Phú Quốc island in An Giang province, Vietnam. The first phase is 17.59 km (10.93 mi) long and will connect Phú Quốc International Airport with the APEC Convention and Exhibition Centre in the south of the island. It will have six stations and sections at ground level, on viaducts and underground.

Sun Group is developing the line under a build–operate–transfer (BOT) contract. Construction started in December 2025. Trial operation is scheduled for June 2027, followed by commercial service in August, before the APEC meetings planned for Phú Quốc later that year.

== History ==
=== Planning and approval ===
Phú Quốc's general plan to 2040, approved by the prime minister on 6 February 2024, provided for two high-capacity public-transport corridors along the island's main north–south axis. It proposed bus rapid transit in the short term and LRT or MRT in the longer term.

In May 2025, the government included an urban railway among the projects to be accelerated for APEC 2027. The preliminary scheme was about 20.2 km (12.6 mi) long, running from the airport to the convention centre and ĐT.973, and was estimated to cost 9 trillion đồng.

The An Giang Provincial People's Council approved the investment policy for the first phase on 24 October 2025. The approved project was about 17.7 km (11.0 mi) long, with five to seven stations, a depot and trains of three to five cars. The estimated investment was 8.949 trillion đồng, excluding interest, and the BOT concession could run for up to 40 years after the line entered service.

=== Construction ===
Work formally began on 19 December 2025. At the groundbreaking, the project was described as a nearly 9 trillion đồng BOT investment, with completion then expected in the second quarter of 2027.

Sun Group signed a contract with CRRC Dalian in January 2026 for 14 three-car trainsets. The first trains were expected to reach Phú Quốc in early 2027 for installation and testing.

By early August 2026, about 1.8 trillion đồng had been disbursed. Bored piles for the bridge foundations had been completed, while work continued on bridge piers, tunnels and the ground-level formation. Track installation began on 11 August. The work is being carried out by a consortium of Vietnam Railways Corporation and China Railway 16th Bureau Group, using 1,435 mm (4 ft 8 1/2 in) grooved rail. Installation was to start on the at-grade section before moving to elevated and underground sections in October.

On 12 August, Sun Group signed a consultancy agreement with Ho Chi Minh City Urban Railway No. 1 Company Limited (HURC1), which operates Ho Chi Minh City Metro Line 1. The contract covers preparations for operation, staff training and trial running. In September, HURC1 announced that it was recruiting 168 staff for the Phú Quốc line: 130 for operations and 38 for maintenance. Recruits are to undergo four months of training before being assigned to Phú Quốc.

== Route and stations ==
The line starts at Phú Quốc International Airport and runs south toward the APEC convention center. Most of the route follows the ĐT.975 corridor. The final section runs along APEC Avenue before entering an underground terminus at the convention centre.

The six stations were presented with regional names in August 2026. Five are at ground level; the Đảo Ngọc terminus is underground.

Stations
No.	Name	Chainage	Location	Type
1	Tây Bắc	km 0+000	Phú Quốc International Airport	At grade
2	Hà Nội	km 3+566	ĐT.975	At grade
3	Huế	km 7+970	ĐT.975	At grade
4	Tây Nguyên	km 11+807	ĐT.975	At grade
5	Sài Gòn	km 15+670	ĐT.975	At grade
6	Đảo Ngọc	km 17+558	Phú Quốc APEC Convention Center	Underground

Tây Bắc serves the airport. The depot is near the second station, at about kilometre 3.8. The station designs use architectural references to regions of Vietnam; for example, Hà Nội draws on the old quarter, Huế on imperial architecture and Tây Nguyên on the Central Highlands.

== Infrastructure and rolling stock ==
The line is double-track and uses standard gauge. Of its 17.59 km (10.93 mi) route, 14.74 km (9.16 mi) is at grade, 2.13 km (1.32 mi) is underground and 0.72 km (0.45 mi) is elevated. Project documents specify 1,500 V DC electrification by overhead line, with six traction substations on the main route and another at the depot.

The CRRC Dalian trains will have three cars. The design speed is up to 100 km/h (62 mph), and published project figures give a maximum capacity of about 4,500 passengers per hour.

== Financing ==
The first phase is being delivered as a public–private partnership under a BOT contract. Its approved preliminary investment was 8.949 trillion đồng. About 34 hectares of land were allocated for the railway, stations, depot and related works.

== Future expansion ==
The 2040 general plan provides for a wider high-capacity public-transport network on Phú Quốc. Separate reporting has mentioned possible extensions toward Dương Đông and An Thới port.

== See also ==
- Rail transport in Vietnam
- Hanoi Metro
- Ho Chi Minh City Metro
