= Thảo Điền =

- Neighborhood
- Thảo Điền aerial view in 2015
- Country: Vietnam
- City: Ho Chi Minh City
- Ward: An Khánh
- Established as ward: January 6, 1997
- Dissolved: July 1, 2025

Area
  - Total: 3.73 km^{2} (1.44 sq mi)

Population (2024)
  - Total: 20,507

Thảo Điền is an area of An Khánh, Ho Chi Minh City, Vietnam. During 1997 to 2025, it was an administrative ward under District 2 then Thủ Đức Municipal City of Ho Chi Minh City.

This area is known as an affluent area with top highest housing price among other places in the city and Vietnam generally with luxury mansions and high-rise apartments. It is also considered an "expat hub," with a significant foreign population that creates a multicultural community. This has led to a fusion of culinary traditions, with restaurants, cafés, architecture and a lifestyle influenced by various countries, all of which serve as a major draw for visitors and new residents.

== Location ==
Thảo Điền is located at the north of Hanoi Highway, section from Saigon Bridge to Võ Trường Toản Street, about 10 km (6.2 mi) away to the northeast of Saigon. However, the section from Võ Trường Toản Street to Rạch Chiếc Bridge, which is part of former An Phú, Thủ Đức (now all in An Khánh), is also colloquially known as part of this area.

The quarter is a peninsula when it mostly covers by Saigon River. It is adjacent to Thanh Đa–Bình Quới peninsula to the north, Thạnh Mỹ Tây to the west, An Phú to the south by Hanoi Highway, and Trường Thọ New Town (Thủ Đức) to the east by Chiếc Canal.

== History ==
=== Etymology ===
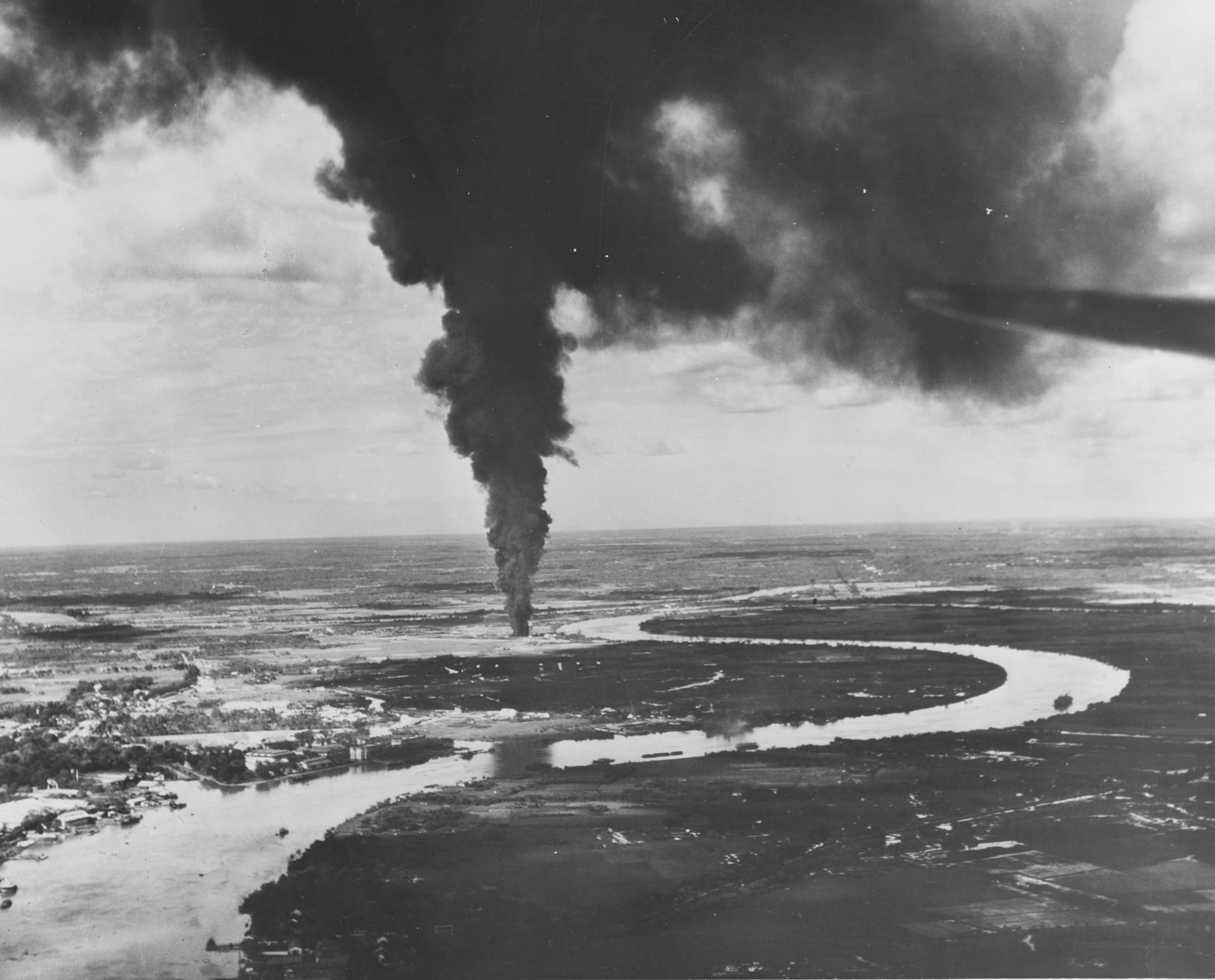
Aerial view of Thảo Điền (on the right of the smoke plume) with Thạnh Mỹ Tây and Thủ Thiêm on the Operation Gratitude in 1945

Thảo Điền name means meadow in Vietnamese, local called it like that as this area was formerly a low-lying, typical delta region of Southern Vietnam, a pristine peninsula surrounded by the Saigon River and small canals, flooded year-round and covered with wild vegetation, cause to a "land full of grass and trees" like a meadow.

=== Administrative ===
Thảo Điền was first settled as a ward of the former District 2, Ho Chi Minh City, it was established on January 6, 1997 from the split of 375 ha of total area and 6.714 of population from the commune of An Phú, Thủ Đức former rural district (or county).

On December 9, 2020, Standing Committee of the National Assembly promulgated Decision of 1111/NQ-UBTVQH14 about establish the Municipal city of Thủ Đức base on the annexation of the urban districts of 2, 9 and Thủ Đức, Thảo Điền ward belongs to the City of Thủ Đức then.

On July 1, 2025, following Vietnam's 2025 administrative reforms, Thảo Điền ward was dissolved and merged with Thủ Thiêm, An Khánh and northern Hanoi Highway part of An Phú, Thủ Đức to be ward of An Khánh, Ho Chi Minh City.

== Characteristics ==
An old villa no longer existed on Hanoi Highway

Before urbanization, Thảo Điền was a northeast suburban area of Saigon or later Ho Chi Minh City characterized by agricultural land, rice paddies, and rice farming and livestock raising. The community was mainly composed of indigenous Vietnamese people, living by agricultural production and small-scale economic activities, with a village-like lifestyle. After the Đổi Mới (Renovation) period in 1986, especially since the establishment of District 2 in 1997, Thảo Điền began to undergo a strong transformation in terms of space and economic structure. Agricultural land was gradually converted into residential areas, villas, apartments, and commercial and service facilities. This process created conditions to attract immigrants from other localities to live and work, making the population structure no longer limited to the indigenous community.

A notable milestone in the history of population transformation in Thảo Điền is the formation of the Journalists' Village (Làng Báo Chí) around 1972–1973, in what was Quarter 3 of Thảo Điền ward before July 2025. This residential area was initially built at the initiative of the Vietnam Journalists' Union (Nghiệp đoàn Ký giả Việt Nam), with about 300 houses for journalists. The suburban living space, quiet and separate from the hustle and bustle of the city center, also attracted a group of artists, writers and painters to live there, notably musician Trinh Cong Son, writer Thuy Vu and painter Ton That Van. The presence of residents working in the fields of journalism and art contributed to creating a distinctive cultural and intellectual character for the area during this period. This was also one of the prerequisites for the formation of the diverse identity of the Thảo Điền community before the area entered a strong process of urbanization and internationalization. Nowadays, some houses in here have been changed into dormitory for students from Ho Chi Minh City University of Culture located nearby. The Journalists' Village is organized around five primary north-south roads, extending from Thảo Điền Street to the embankment along the Saigon River. These roads are numbered from 1 to 5, running from east to west (Road No. 3 has been renamed Trúc Đường Road). These five roads are intersected by two unnamed east-west cross-streets; an intersection occurs roughly every one to two houses along the route. To the west, the area borders an unnamed canal—a tributary of the Saigon River—while to the east, it adjacent to the An Phú Superior Villa Compound.

From the 2000s onwards, along with the increase in real estate investment and international integration, Thảo Điền gradually became a place where many groups of people with different economic conditions gathered. Notably, there was the emergence of the Vietnamese middle and upper classes, including entrepreneurs, investors, professionals, and high-income households. At the same time, this area attracted a large number of foreigners, especially professionals, management personnel, and families from Europe and many other countries. The development of international schools, foreign restaurants, high-end apartments, and services serving the international community contributed to shaping Thảo Điền's image as a multicultural residential area with an international lifestyle.

However, this change also created significant differences in economic conditions and access to living spaces among different groups of people. Besides the high-income and foreign resident community, Thảo Điền still has long-standing local households, migrant workers, and lower-income service workers. Nguyen Thi Hong Giang's (2017) research from Vietnamese-German University indicates that this area exhibits income disparity, housing heterogeneity, and social fragmentation among resident groups. Thus, the development process of Thảo Điền not only reflects the shift from a suburban agricultural area to a modern urban area, but also shows a change in social structure, from a relatively homogeneous community to a multi-layered, multinational community with clear economic differentiation.

== Attractions ==
Thảo Điền is considered one of the most attractive neighborhoods in the city, not only for tourists but also for many city residents. It was ranked at 16 over 38 coolest neighborhoods in 2024 by the global magazine Time Out Worldwide. According to the article, Thảo Điền is known for being a walkable, tree-lined neighborhood packed with restaurants, spas and cool boutiques. Due to being developed as an affluent area and turning into an expat hub, with high-rise condos, luxury mansions and international schools, Thảo Điền has more recently flourished as a hub for young Vietnamese talent putting their own stamp on food, art and culture.

=== Restaurants, Café and Bars ===
Inside the restaurant Mặn Mòi, Thảo Điền

As Thảo Điền is a miniature "international village," therefore the restaurants here are incredibly diverse, featuring a blend of international styles and refined local cuisine. Some of them are being honored by Michelin Guide, including: 1-star Innovative Fine dining restaurant CieL and Vietnamese cuisine restaurant Upstair, Bib Gourmand-status Vietnamese cuisine restaurant Mặn Mòi, Thảo Điền and the Michelin Selected Madame Lam Vietnamese cuisine Restaurant with Du Yên Vegetarian Restaurant.

Thảo Điền is also known for its stylish coffeehouses and vibrant nightlife clubs, some notable are Swarovski Café, Café Carre, The Original Buddha Bar & Grill (since 2004), Pasteur Street Caraft Beer, Saigon Outcast, etc.

Some restaurants and café here are operated by Vietnamese celebrities like Cà Phê Cà Pháo by Đàm Vĩnh Hưng, Chanchan Vegatarian Noodle Bar by Ngô Thanh Vân with her husband at 25A Ngô Quang Huy, The Crab Shack by Tăng Thanh Hà at 14 Lê Văn Miến.

=== Shopping ===
Thảo Điền is considered one of the most stylish centers for designer fashion, local brands, and concept stores in Ho Chi Minh City, according to Condé Nast Traveler. Some notable brands are: OBJoff (An independent retail space featuring many prominent Vietnamese designers such as Aeie Studios, Latui Atelier, Paradise Saigon, combined with a garden cafe and music and DJ events), Devons Studio, CMMN Space, Saang Dresses (A slow fashion boutique that designs and tailors 100% on-site, specializing in dresses and event wear), RYACTIVE, LYKKE Studios + Bar (An integrated model combining a boutique fashion store and a bar space), L'Espoir Studios, and Fancì Club (A globally renowned corset and Y2K fashion brand endorsed by many international stars such as Lisa, Nayeon, Olivia Rodrigo, Doja Cat and more).

Some major shopping centers and market in the area are:

- Vincom Mega Mall Thảo Điền: part of Masteri Thảo Điền development
- Pearl Center: a complex comprising shopping, Saigon Vintage Market Fair, a CGV Cinema, restaurants, and renting office space at the base of the Thảo Điền Pearl twin-tower apartment building
- Thảo Điền Market: a local traditional market

== Access ==
Thao Dien station on Metro Line 1 and future Line 5

Thảo Điền located on Hanoi Highway, a thoroughfare connected directly to Đa Kao (part of Downtown Saigon) by vehicles in just 10 minutes averagely. The highway section went through the quarter runs along with the Metro Line 1 and the planned Line 5 with 3 stations on it are Thao Dien station (next to Saigon Bridge and Thảo Điền Pearl), An Phu station (directly connect to Vincom Mega Mall Thảo Điền) and Rach Chiec station (for the area most-eastern part).

View from Thảo Điền Pier

The area is also connect with the city center by Saigon Waterbus, where the Thảo Điền Pier is on the route.

== Notable buildings ==
Gallery of notable buildings in Thảo Điền, including former part of An Phú merged into An Khánh:

Q2 Thảo Điền Fraser by Frasers Property

Gateway Thảo Điền by

Lumière Riverside Towers by Masterise Group

The Vista An Phú by CapitaLand featuring Somerset Vista Ho Chi Minh City by The Ascott Limited
