= Thao Dien station =

Metro station in Ho Chi Minh City, Vietnam

Coordinates: 10.8005°N 106.7335°E

L1 06 Thao Dien Thảo Điền
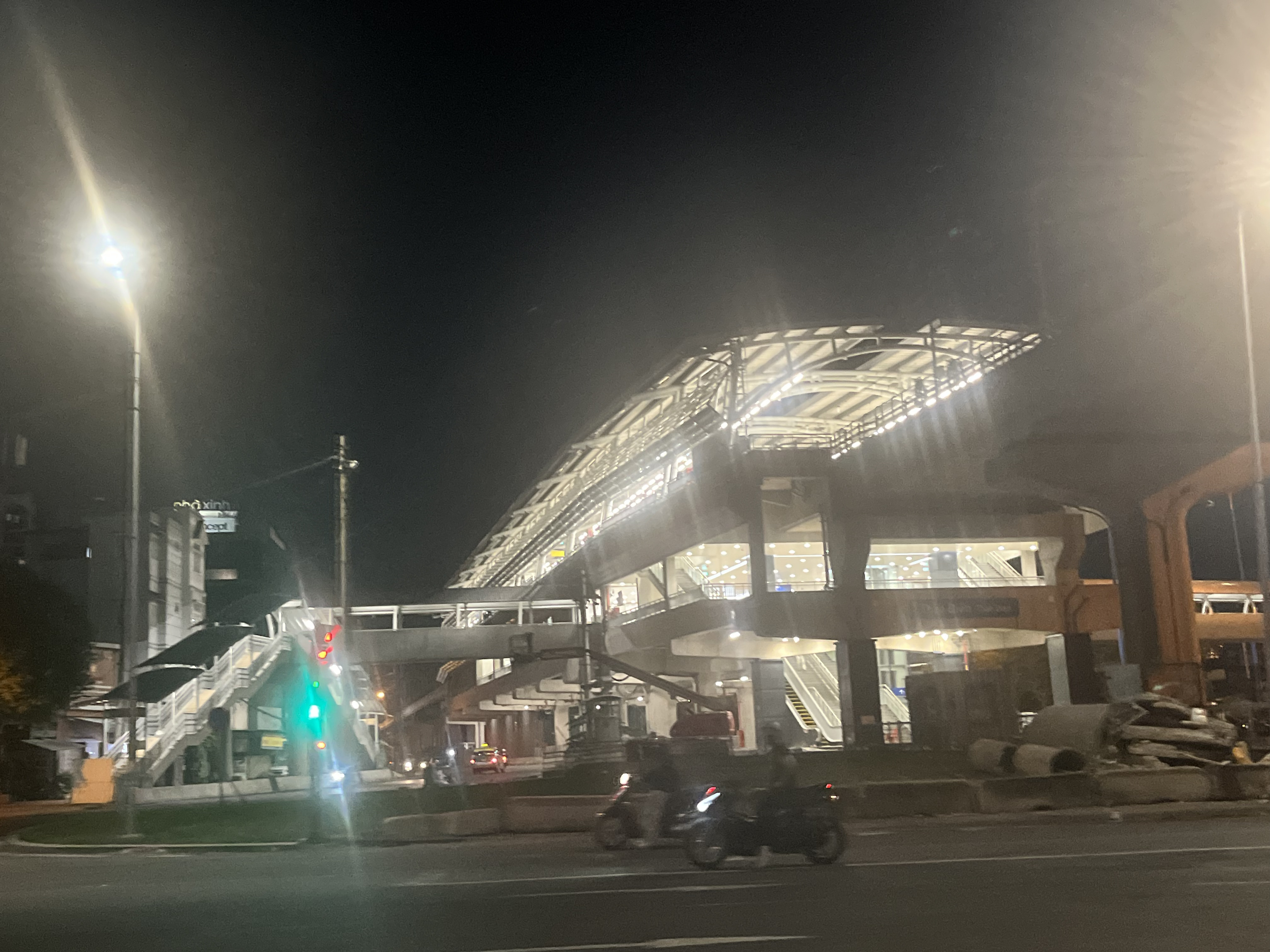
- Thao Dien station at night

General information
- Location: Saigon Bridge Park, Thảo Điền, Thủ Đức, Ho Chi Minh City, Vietnam
- System: Ho Chi Minh City Metro station
- Line: L1

Construction
- Structure type: Elevated

Other information
- Status: Completed

History
- Opened: 22 December 2024

Services
Preceding station	Ho Chi Minh City Metro	Following station
Tan Cang L1 05 towards Ben Thanh	Line 1	An Phu L1 07 towards Suoi Tien Terminal
Route map
Location

Thao Dien station (Vietnamese: Ga Thảo Điền) is an elevated Ho Chi Minh City Metro station on Line 1. Located in Thao Dien Ward, Thu Duc City, next to the Saigon Bridge, the station opened on 22 December 2024.

== Station layout ==
2F; Platform	Side platform, doors will open on the right
2F; Platform	Platform 1	← L1 Line 1 to Tan Cang (for Ben Thanh) Transfer to L5 Line 5 on the next station
2F; Platform	Platform 2	L1 Line 1 to An Phu (for Suoi Tien Terminal) →
2F; Platform	Side platform, doors will open on the right
1F	1st Floor	Ticket sales area, commercial area, technical department area, platform gates & ticket gates
GF	Ground Floor	Entrances/Exits and technical department area
