= Ba Son station =

Railway station in Ho Chi Minh City, Vietnam

L1 03 Ba Son
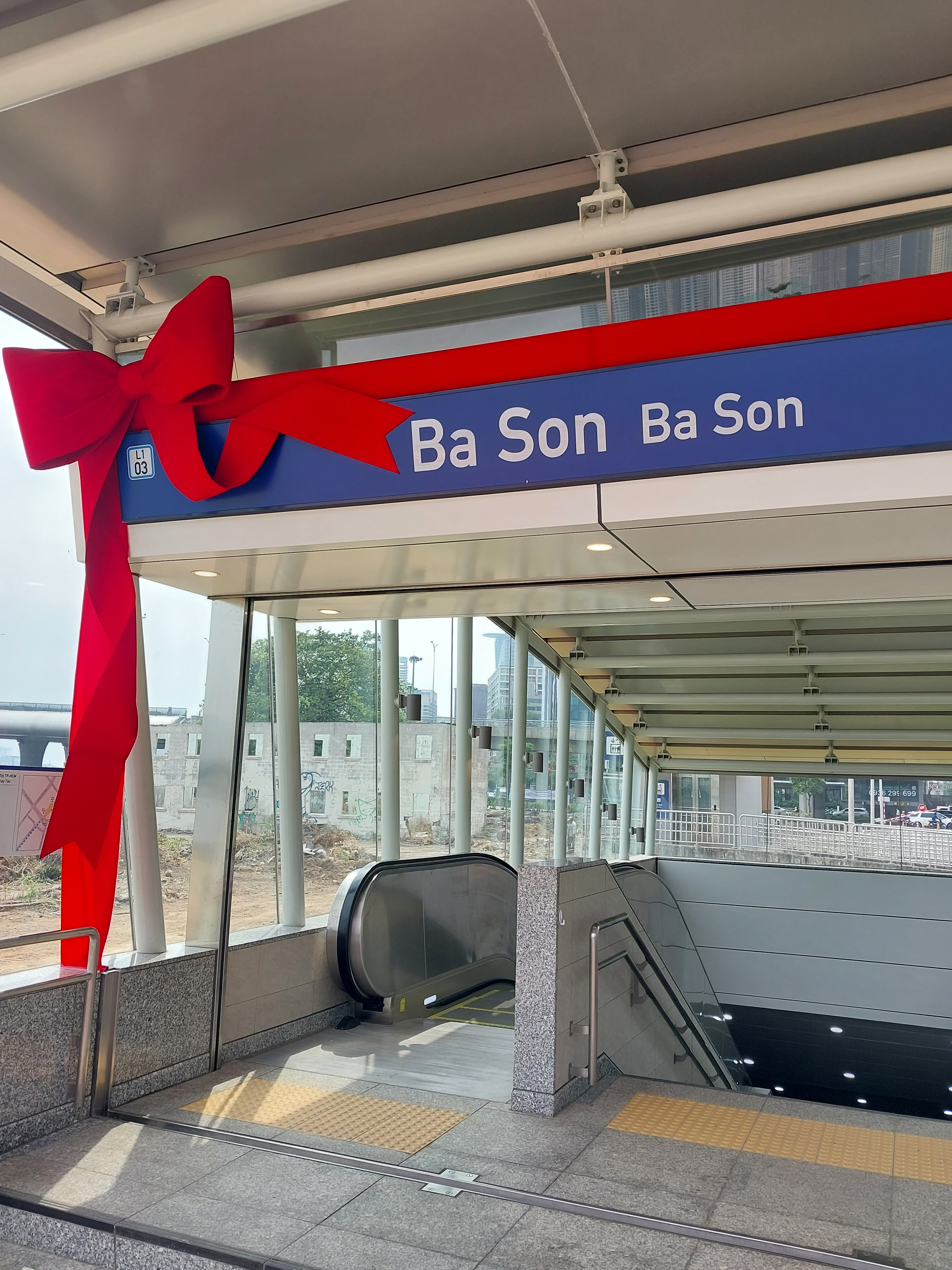
- Entrance 3 of the station next to Saigon Marina IFC Tower

General information
- Location: Tôn Đức Thắng Boulevard, Bến Nghé, District 1, Ho Chi Minh City, Vietnam
- System: Ho Chi Minh City Metro station
- Line: L1
- Bus routes: 30, 44, 53, 56, 88, 155

Construction
- Structure type: Underground

Other information
- Status: Completed

History
- Opened: 22 December 2024

Services
| Preceding station | Ho Chi Minh City Metro | Following station |
|---|---|---|
| Opera House L1 02 towards Ben Thanh | Line 1 | Van Thanh Park L1 04 towards Suoi Tien Terminal |
Route map
Location

Ba Son station (Vietnamese: Ga Ba Son) is an underground Ho Chi Minh City Metro station on Line 1. Located in District 1 at the site of the former Ba Son Shipyard (now is Ba Son Complex) next to the Ba Son Bridge, the station opened on 22 December 2024.

== Station layout ==
| GF | Ground Floor | Entrances/Exits |
| B1F | 1st Floor | Ticket sales area, commercial area, technical department area, platform gates & ticket gates |
| B2F; Platform | Platform 1 | ← L1 Line 1 to Opera House (for Ben Thanh) |
| B2F; Platform | Island platform, doors will open on the right |
| B2F; Platform | Platform 2 | L1 Line 1 to Van Thanh Park (for Suoi Tien Terminal) → |

== Surrounding area ==
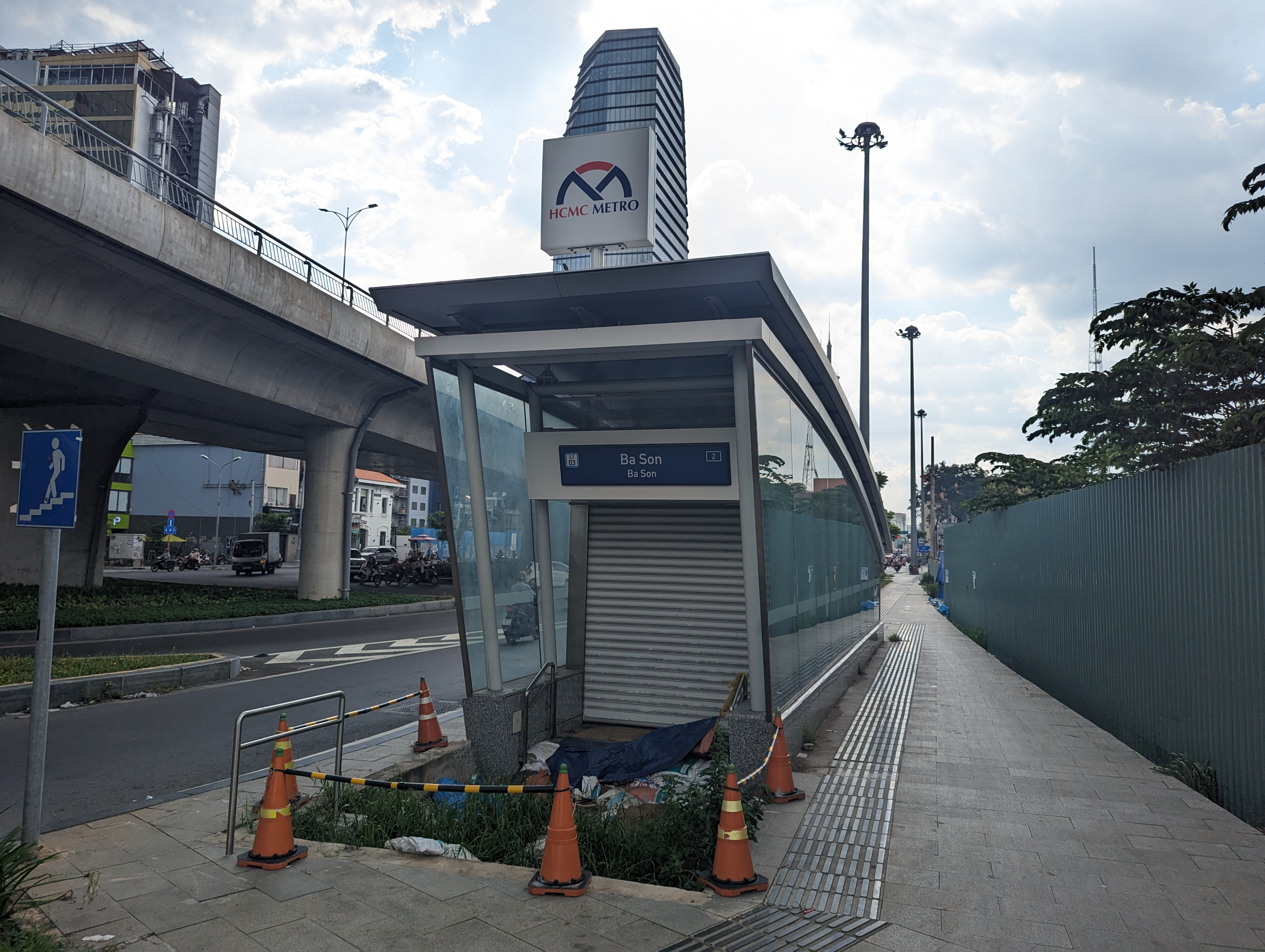
Entrance 2 of the station next to Ba Son Bridge

Buildings surround the station in a radius of under a kilometer:

- Ho Chi Minh City Television
- Children's Hospital 2
- Bến Nghé Ward People's Committee
- Audi Ho Chi Minh City
- Saigon Archdiocesan Pastoral Center
- Sisters of St. Paul of Chartres convent
- Carmelite Monastery of Saigon
- Trưng Vương High School
- Võ Trường Toản Secondary School
- Ho Chi Minh City University of Social Sciences and Humanities – Main campus
- Saigon University – Faculty of Kindergarten Pedagogy
- Saigon Zoo and Botanical Gardens
- Geological Museum of Vietnam
- Ho Chi Minh City History Museum
- Hoa Lư Sports Center
- Ba Son Complex (Gate 2, 3, 4, 5)
  - Saigon Marina IFC (directly connected to Gate 4 and 5)
  - Grand Marina Saigon – Residences by Marriott International
  - Vinhomes Golden River
  - Ba Son Traditional House
- Petrolimex Saigon
- Saigon Trade Center
- Green Power Tower – EVNHCMC
- Sonatus Building
- VFC Tower
- CJ Building
- Lim Tower
- The Vertex Private Residences (Under construction)
- The Waterfront Saigon (next to Gate 1)
- Le Méridien Saigon (next to Gate 1)
- The Nexus Complex (directly connected to Gate 1)
  - The Nexus
  - The Kross (Under construction)
  - Riverfront Financial Center (Formerly VPBank Tower Saigon)
- The Metropole Thủ Thiêm Complex
  - The Hallmark
  - The MeTT
  - The Crest Residence
  - The Galleria Residence
  - The Opera Residence
  - The OpusK Office & Residence (Under construction)
- Lotte Hotel Saigon
- Saigon Riverside Office Center
- The Landmark
- Tôn Đức Thắng Museum
- Thái Văn Lung Street, the Japantown of Saigon
- IBC Building
- Vietcombank Tower
- Hilton Saigon Hotel
- Mê Linh Point
- Renaissance Riverside Hotel Saigon
- Mê Linh Square
- Bạch Đằng Quay
- Saigon Waterbus
- Katinat Coffee & Teahouse
- Starbucks Waterbus

== Gallery ==
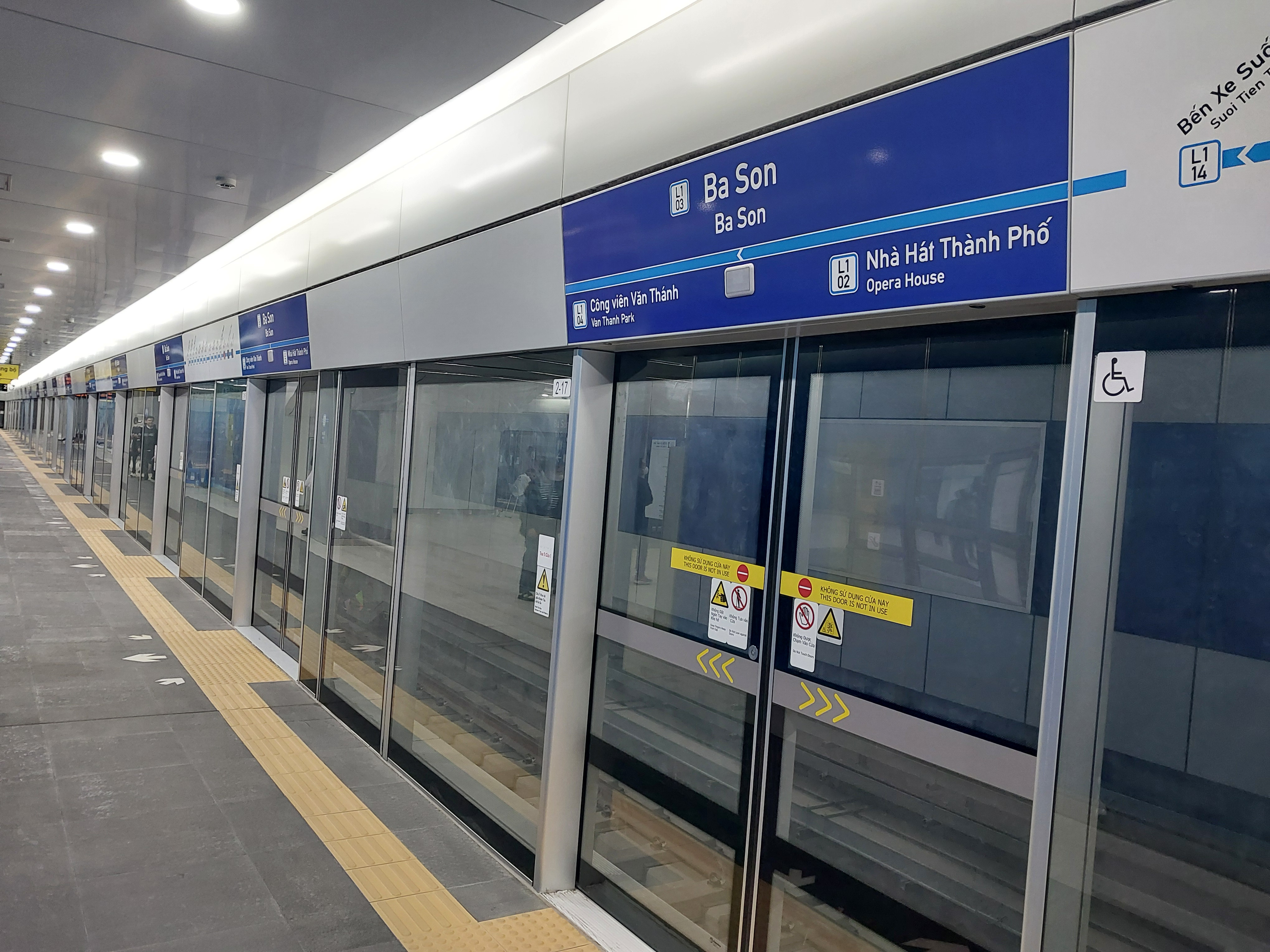
Metro platform of the Ba Son Station

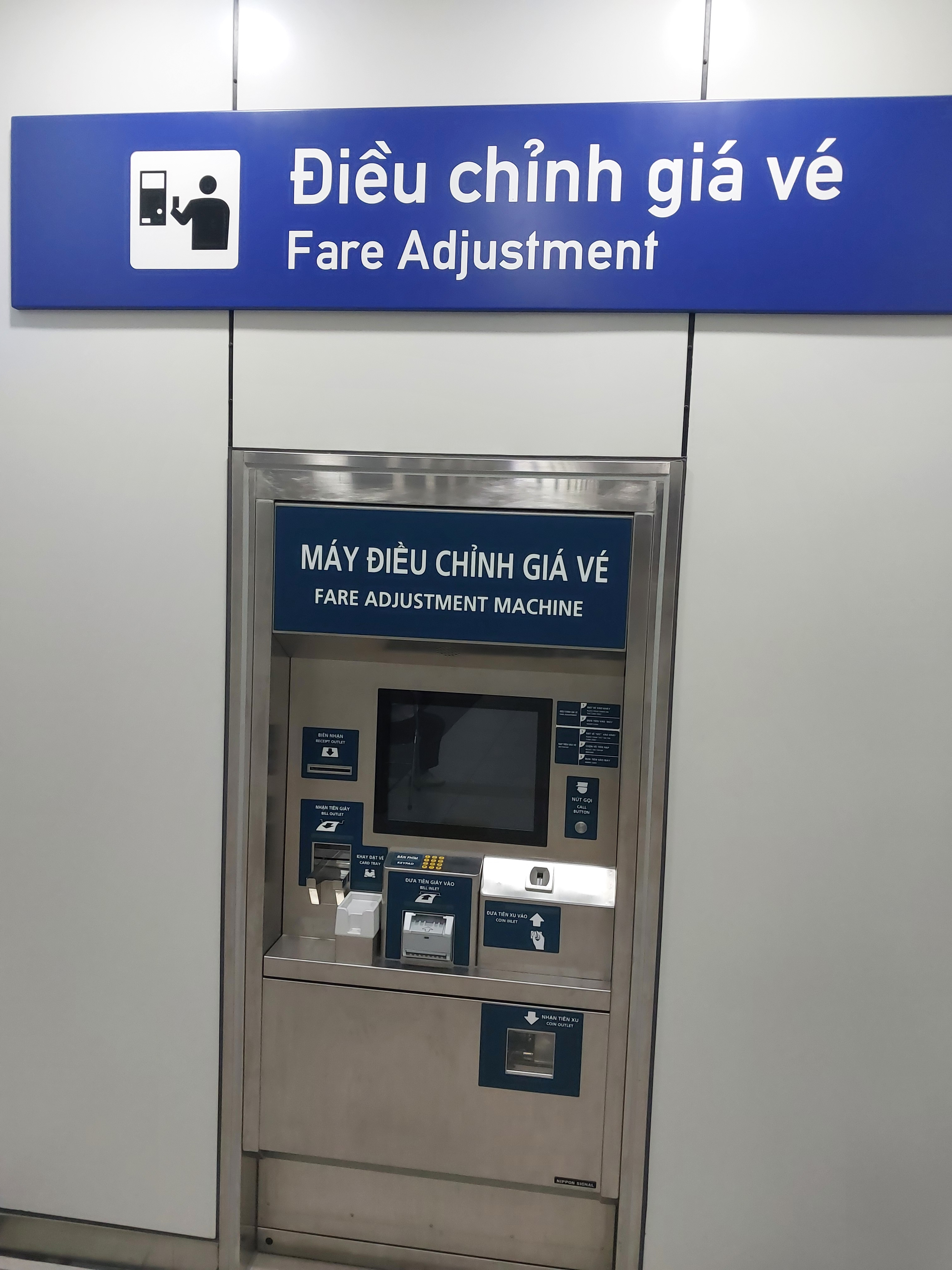
Fare adjustment machine in Ba Son station
