= High Tech Park station =

Metro station in Ho Chi Minh City, Vietnam

L1 12 High Tech Park Khu Công nghệ cao
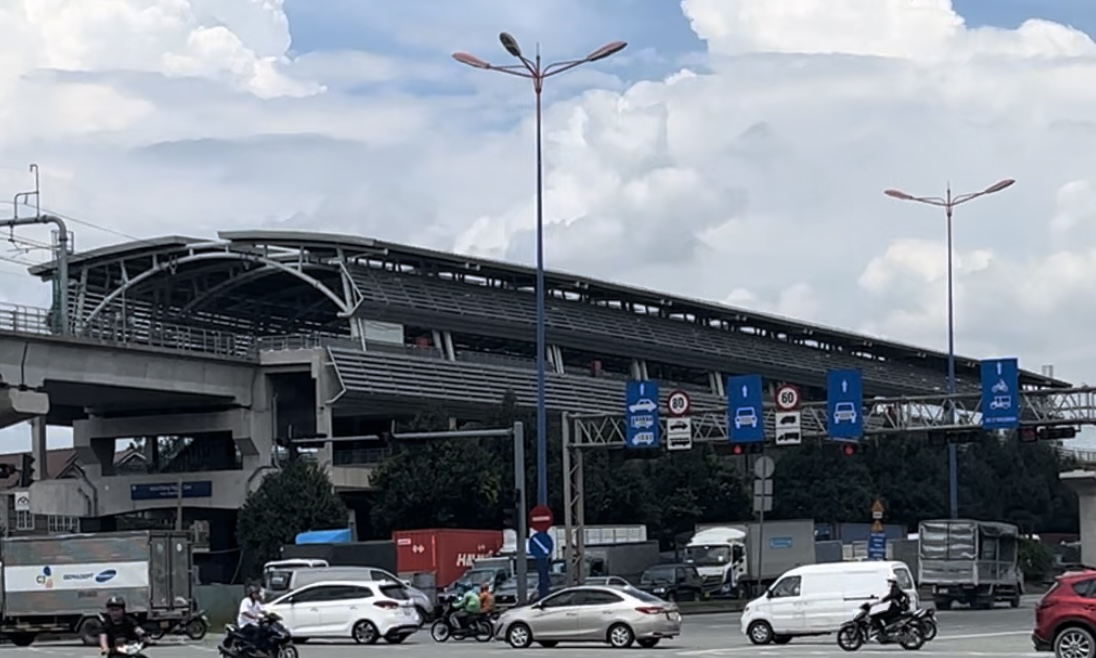

General information
- Location: Hà Nội Highway, Linh Trung, Thủ Đức, Ho Chi Minh City, Vietnam
- System: Ho Chi Minh City Metro station
- Line: L1

Construction
- Structure type: Elevated

Other information
- Status: Completed

History
- Opened: 22 December 2024

Services
Preceding station	Ho Chi Minh City Metro	Following station
Thu Duc L1 11 towards Ben Thanh	Line 1	National University L1 13 towards Suoi Tien Terminal
Route map
Location

High Tech Park station (Vietnamese: Ga Khu Công nghệ cao) is an elevated Ho Chi Minh City Metro station on Line 1. Located opposite Saigon Hi-Tech Park and in front of The Coca-Cola Beverages Vietnam Company, the station opened on 22 December 2024.

== Station layout ==
2F; Platform	Side platform, doors will open on the right
2F; Platform	Platform 1	← L1 Line 1 to Thu Duc (for Ben Thanh)
2F; Platform	Platform 2	L1 Line 1 to National University (for Suoi Tien Terminal) →
2F; Platform	Side platform, doors will open on the right
1F	1st Floor	Ticket sales area, commercial area, technical department area, platform gates & ticket gates
GF	Ground Floor	Entrances/Exits and technical department area
