= Tan Cang station =

Metro station in Ho Chi Minh City, Vietnam

Coordinates: 10.7985°N 106.7233°E

L1 05 Tan Cang Tân Cảng
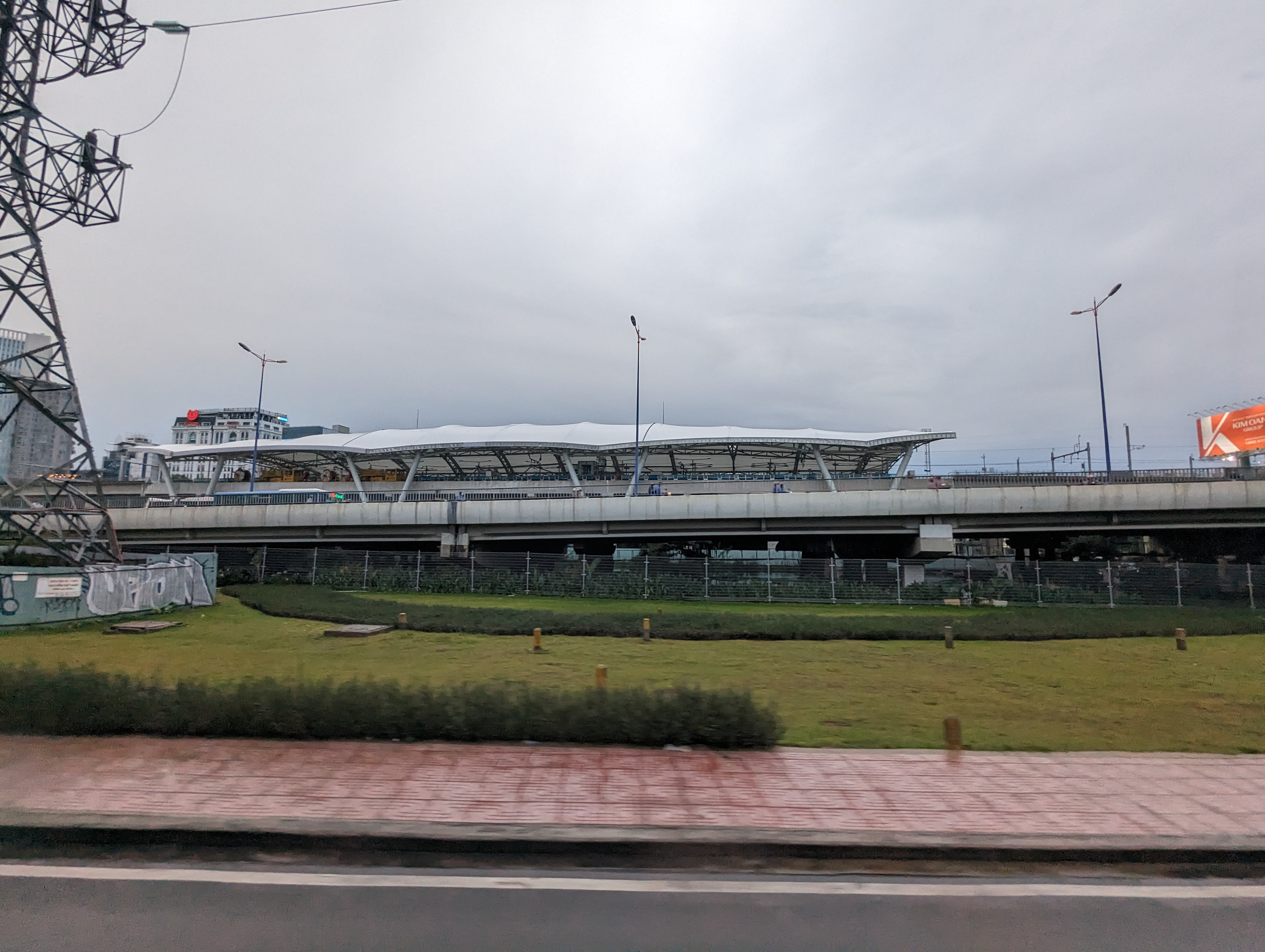

General information
- Location: Bình Thạnh District, Ho Chi Minh City, Vietnam
- System: Ho Chi Minh City Metro station
- Line: L1 L5

Construction
- Structure type: Elevated

Other information
- Status: Completed

History
- Opened: 22 December 2024

Services
Preceding station	Ho Chi Minh City Metro	Following station
Van Thanh Park L1 04 towards Ben Thanh	Line 1	Thao Dien L1 06 towards Suoi Tien Terminal
Terminus	Line 5 Phase 1 - Proposed	Hàng Xanh L5 02 towards New Cần Giuộc Bus Station
Route map
Location

Tan Cang station (Vietnamese: Ga Tân Cảng) is an elevated Ho Chi Minh City Metro station on Line 1 and the future Line 5. Located on Điện Biên Phủ Boulevard in Bình Thạnh District, next to Saigon Bridge, the station opened on 22 December 2024.

It was named after the nearby former Saigon Newport (Tân Cảng Sài Gòn), which is now the Vinhomes Central Park development area, where the highest building in Vietnam, Landmark 81, is located here.

== Surrounding area ==
- Vinhomes Central Park / Landmark 81
- Pearl Plaza
- CII Tower
- Cantavil Hoàn Cầu Apartment
- North Văn Thánh Residents Quarter
- Dock Residents Quarter (Cư xá Ụ Tàu)
- Tân Cảng Residents Quarter
- Tân Cảng Saigon Waterbus pier
- Tân Cảng Tourist Village

== Station layout ==
2F; Platform	Platform 1	← L1 Line 1 to Van Thanh Park (for Ben Thanh)
2F; Platform	Island platform, doors will open on the left/right
2F; Platform	Platform 2	← L1 Line 1 to Van Thanh Park (for Ben Thanh)
2F; Platform	Platform 3	L1 Line 1 to Thao Dien (for Suoi Tien Terminal) →
2F; Platform	Island platform, doors will open on the left/right
2F; Platform	Platform 4	L1 Line 1 to Thao Dien (for Suoi Tien Terminal) →
1F	1st Floor	Ticket sales area, commercial area, technical department area, platform gates & ticket gates
GF	Ground Floor	Entrances/Exits and technical department area
