= Rach Chiec station =

Planned metro station in Thu Duc, Ho Chi Minh City, Vietnam

L1 08 Rach Chiec Rạch Chiếc
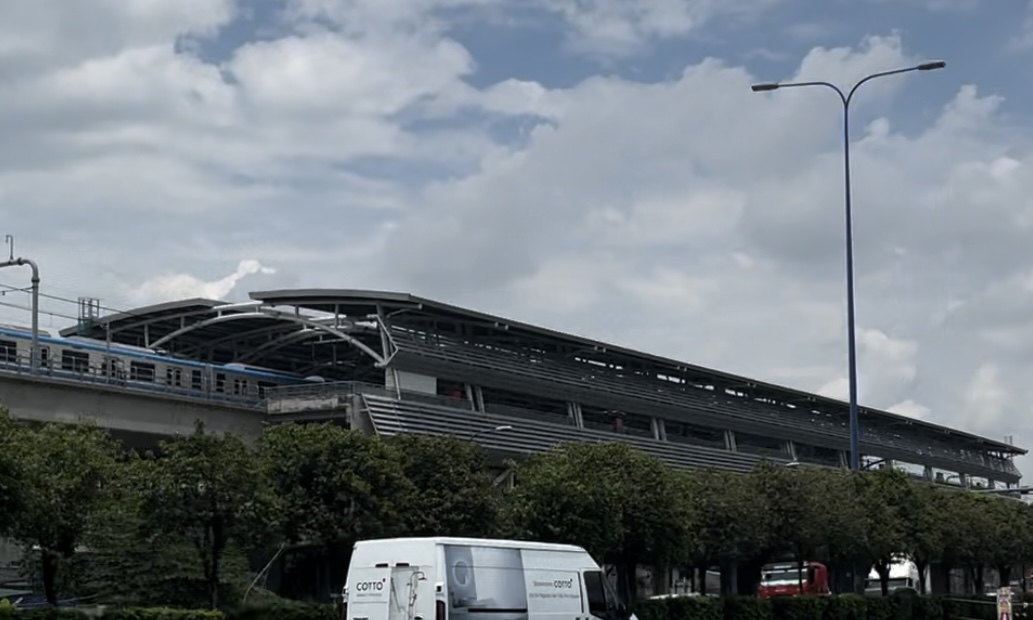

General information
- Location: An Phu Ward, Thủ Đức, Ho Chi Minh City, Vietnam
- System: Ho Chi Minh City Metro station
- Line: L1

Construction
- Structure type: Elevated

Other information
- Status: Completed

History
- Opened: 22 December 2024

Services
Preceding station	Ho Chi Minh City Metro	Following station
An Phu L1 07 towards Ben Thanh	Line 1	Phuoc Long L1 09 towards Suoi Tien Terminal
Route map
Location

Rach Chiec station (Vietnamese: Ga Rạch Chiếc) is an elevated Ho Chi Minh City Metro station on Line 1. Located in An Phú Ward, Thủ Đức, Ho Chi Minh City, the station opened on 22 December 2024.

== Station layout ==
2F; Platform	Side platform, doors will open on the right
2F; Platform	Platform 1	← L1 Line 1 to An Phu (for Ben Thanh)
2F; Platform	Platform 2	L1 Line 1 to Phuoc Long (for Suoi Tien Terminal) →
2F; Platform	Side platform, doors will open on the right
1F	1st Floor	Ticket sales area, commercial area, technical department area, platform gates & ticket gates
GF	Ground Floor	Entrances/Exits and technical department area

== Surrounding area ==
- The Vista An Phú Residences
  - The Oxygen Mall
- The Somerset Vista Apartment Hotel & Office Building
- Minh Đăng Quang Pagoda & Buddhist Institute
- Rạch Chiếc Bridge
- Rạch Chiếc Bridge Memorial Park
- Rạch Chiếc National Sports Complex (On hold)
