= Van Thanh Park station =

Metro station in Ho Chi Minh City, Vietnam

Coordinates: 10.7960°N 106.7155°E

L1 04 Van Thanh Park Công viên Văn Thánh
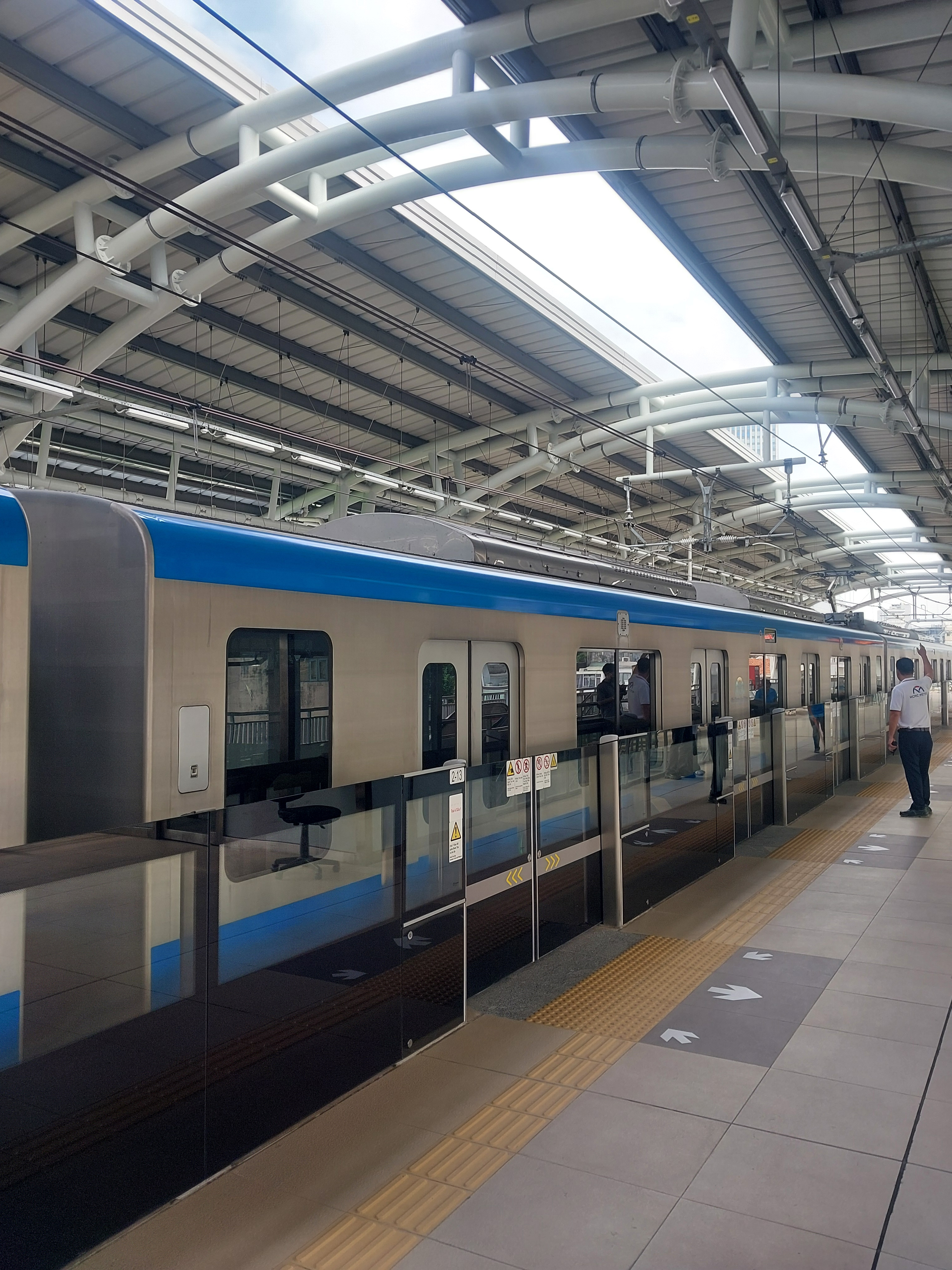
- Departing train at Van Thanh Park station with glimpse of Pearl Plaza Tower behind the roof

General information
- Location: Binh Thanh District, Ho Chi Minh City, Vietnam
- System: Ho Chi Minh City Metro station
- Line: L1

Construction
- Structure type: Underground

Other information
- Status: Completed

History
- Opened: 22 December 2024

Services
Preceding station	Ho Chi Minh City Metro	Following station
Ba Son L1 03 towards Ben Thanh	Line 1	Tan Cang L1 05 towards Suoi Tien Terminal
Route map
Location

Văn Thánh Park station (Vietnamese: Ga Công viên Văn Thánh) is an elevated Ho Chi Minh City Metro station on Line 1. Located in the same name park or officially known as Văn Thánh Tourist Village, Bình Thạnh District, the station opened on 22 December 2024.

== Station layout ==
2F; Platform	Side platform, doors will open on the right
2F; Platform	Platform 1	← L1 Line 1 to Ba Son (for Ben Thanh)
2F; Platform	Platform 2	L1 Line 1 to Tan Cang (for Suoi Tien Terminal) Transfer to L5 Line 5 on the next station →
2F; Platform	Side platform, doors will open on the right
1F	1st Floor	Ticket sales area, commercial area, technical department area, platform gates & ticket gates
GF	Ground Floor	Entrances/Exits and technical department area

== Surrounding area ==
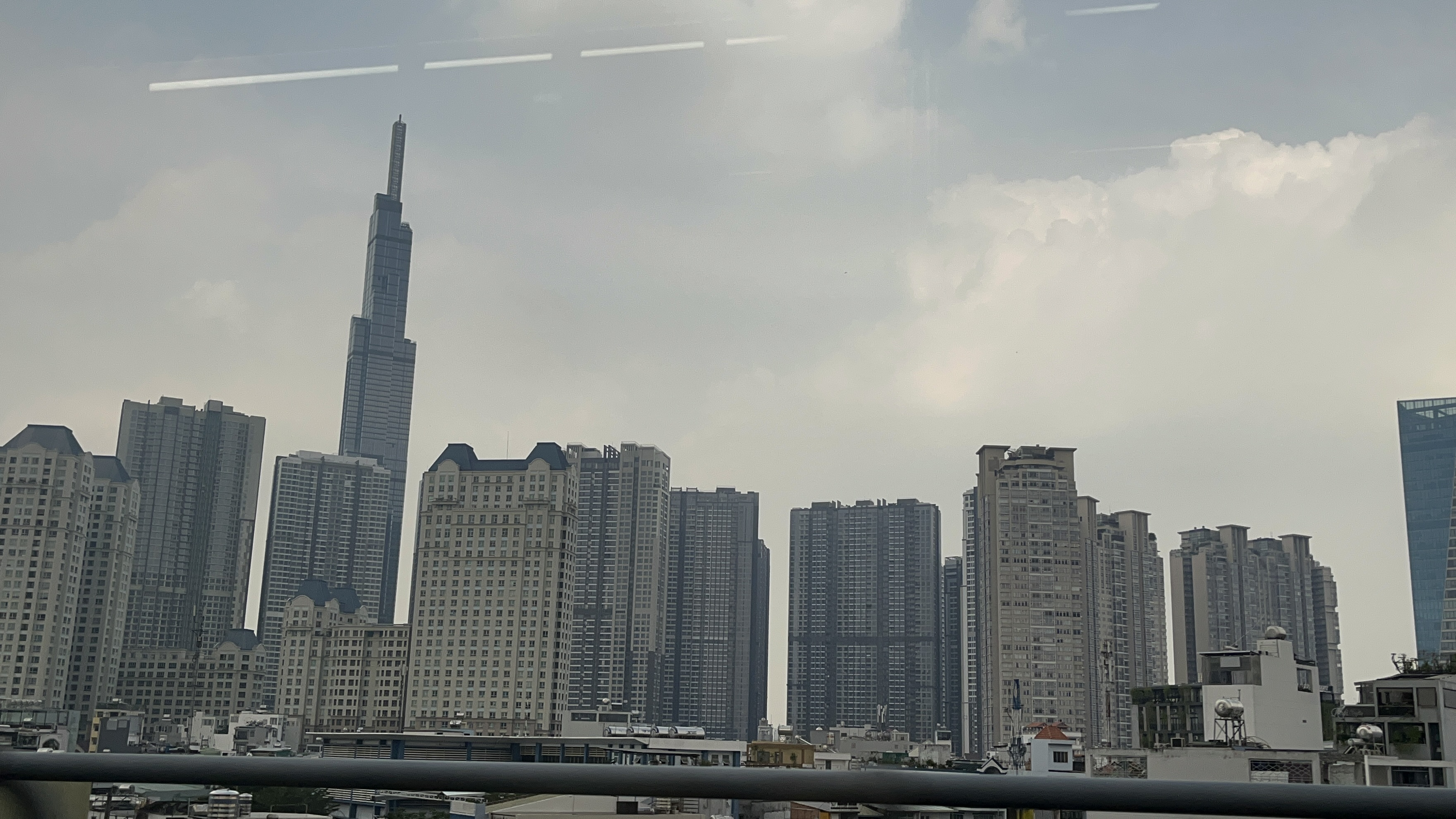
Train coming to Văn Thánh Park station viewing buildings on Nguyễn Hữu Cảnh Boulevard

- Văn Thánh Tourist Village
- Văn Thánh Temple - National Historical Site
- College Board - Tôn Đức Thắng University
- Pearl Plaza
- CII Tower
- Cantavil Hoàn Cầu Apartment
- City Garden Apartment
- Bitexco The Manor Ho Chi Minh
- Saigon Pearl Development Area / Opal Tower / Sunwah Pearl
- Ngô Tất Tố Apartment
- Phạm Viết Chánh Apartment
