= An Phu station =

Metro station in Ho Chi Minh City, Vietnam

Coordinates: 10.8022°N 106.7423°E

L1 07 An Phu An Phú
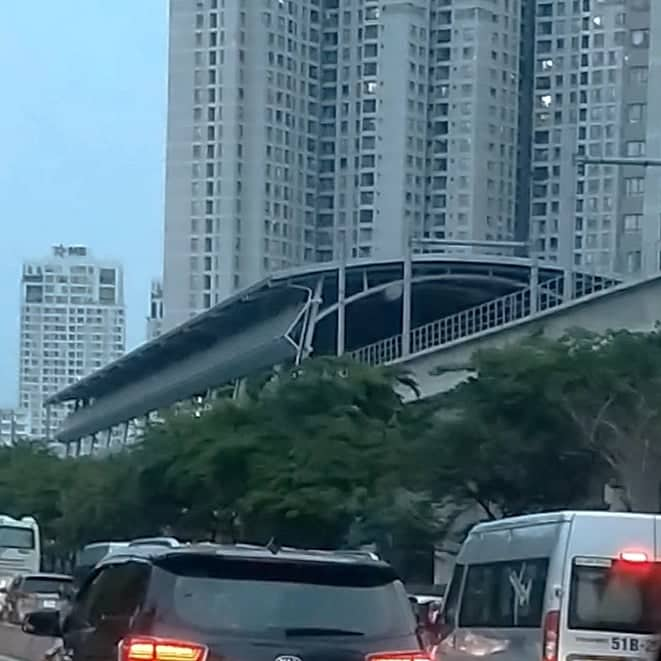

General information
- Location: Thảo Điền, Thủ Đức, Ho Chi Minh City, Vietnam
- System: Ho Chi Minh City Metro station
- Line: L1

Construction
- Structure type: Elevated

Other information
- Status: Completed

History
- Opened: 22 December 2024

Services
Preceding station	Ho Chi Minh City Metro	Following station
Thao Dien L1 06 towards Ben Thanh	Line 1	Rach Chiec L1 08 towards Suoi Tien Terminal
Route map
Location

An Phu station (Vietnamese: Ga An Phú) is an elevated Ho Chi Minh City Metro station on Line 1. Located in Thảo Điền ward, Thủ Đức city, the station opened on 22 December 2024.

== Station layout ==
2F; Platform	Platform 1	← L1 Line 1 to Thao Dien (for Ben Thanh)
2F; Platform	Island platform, doors will open on the left
2F; Platform	Platform 2	L1 Line 1 to Rach Chiec (for Suoi Tien Terminal) →
1F	1st Floor	Ticket sales area, commercial area, technical department area, platform gates & ticket gates
GF	Ground Floor	Entrances/Exits and technical department area

== Surrounding area ==
Both platforms of the station are surrounded by many services, connected by a pedestrian bridge, with the area opposite and in the southside of the station is An Phú ward, some construction here are directly connected with the bridge are marked as *.

=== Platform 1 ===
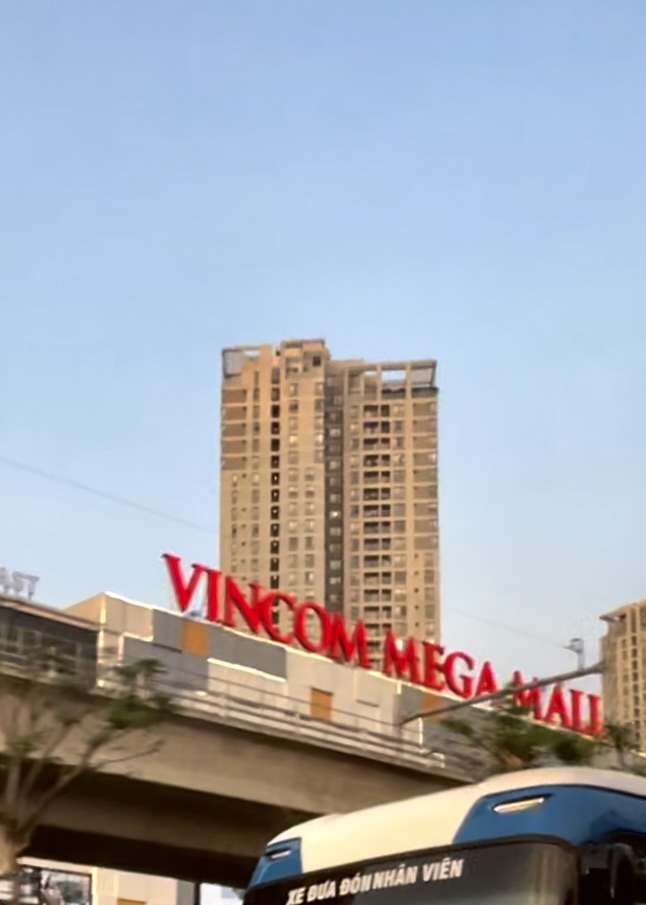
View from Platform 1

- Vincom Mega Mall Thảo Điền*
- An Phú Supermarket
- Masteri Thảo Điền Apartment
- Masteri An Phú Apartment
- Lumière Riverside Twin Building Complex
- The Village of Journalists
- An Phú Superior Villa Compound (APSC)
- Australian International School Saigon Thảo Điền Campus

=== Platform 2 ===
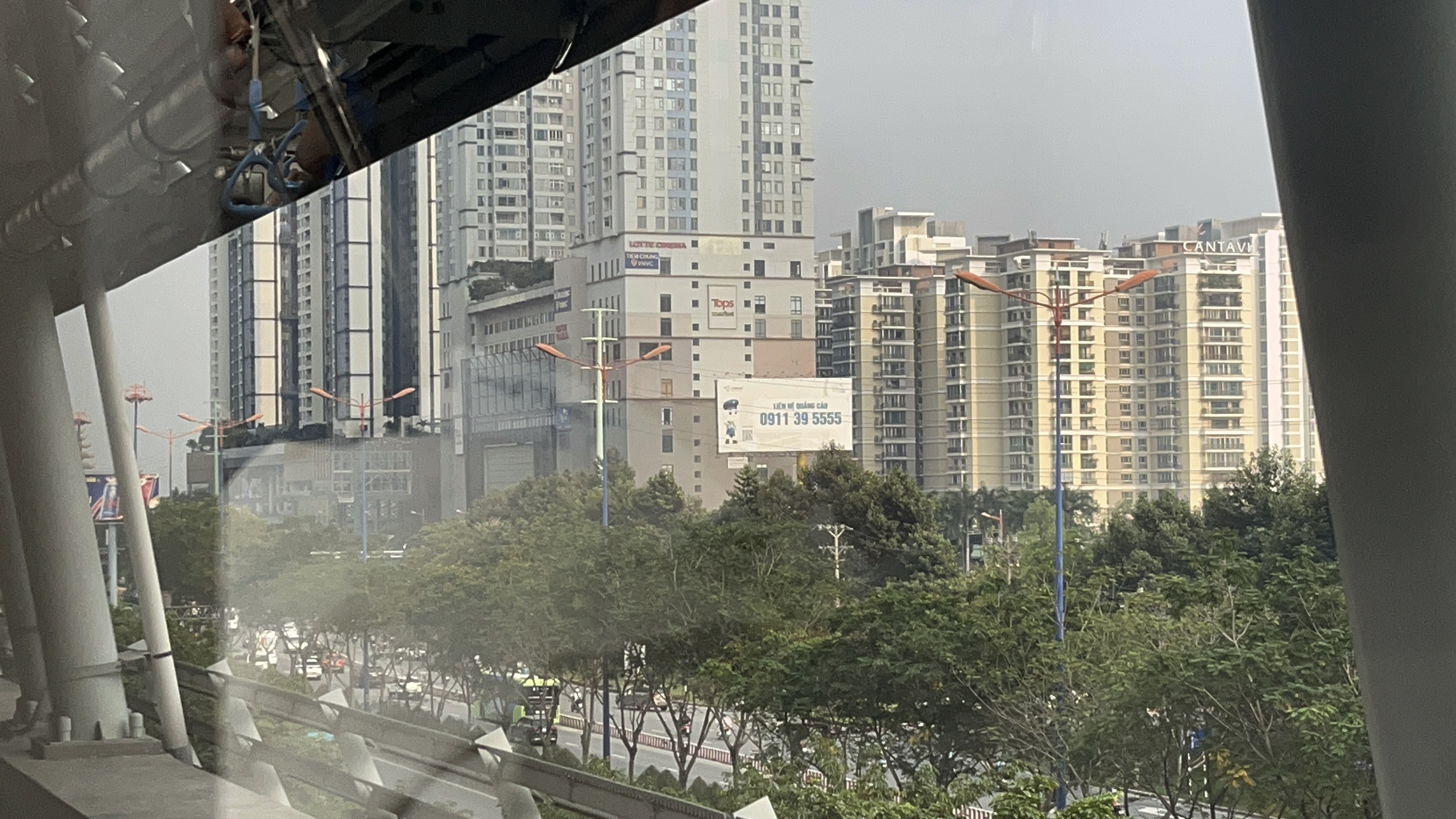
View from Platform 2

- Mega Market An Phú*
- Ho Chi Minh City Tax Department
- American International Hospital
- International School Ho Chi Minh City - Primary School
- Thủ Thiêm High School
- An Phú - An Khánh New City Development
- An Phú New City Development
- Cantavil An Phú Complex by Daewon and Thuduc House
  - Cantavil Premier Complex Building
  - Cantavil Premier Mall (previously Parkson Cantavil Shopping Mall until 2018)
  - Cantavil Premier Apartment
- Estella An Phú Complex by Keppel Land
  - The Estella
  - Estella Heights
  - Estella Place Shopping Mall
