= Line 1 (Ho Chi Minh City Metro) =

Rapid transit line in Ho Chi Minh City, Vietnam

- L1
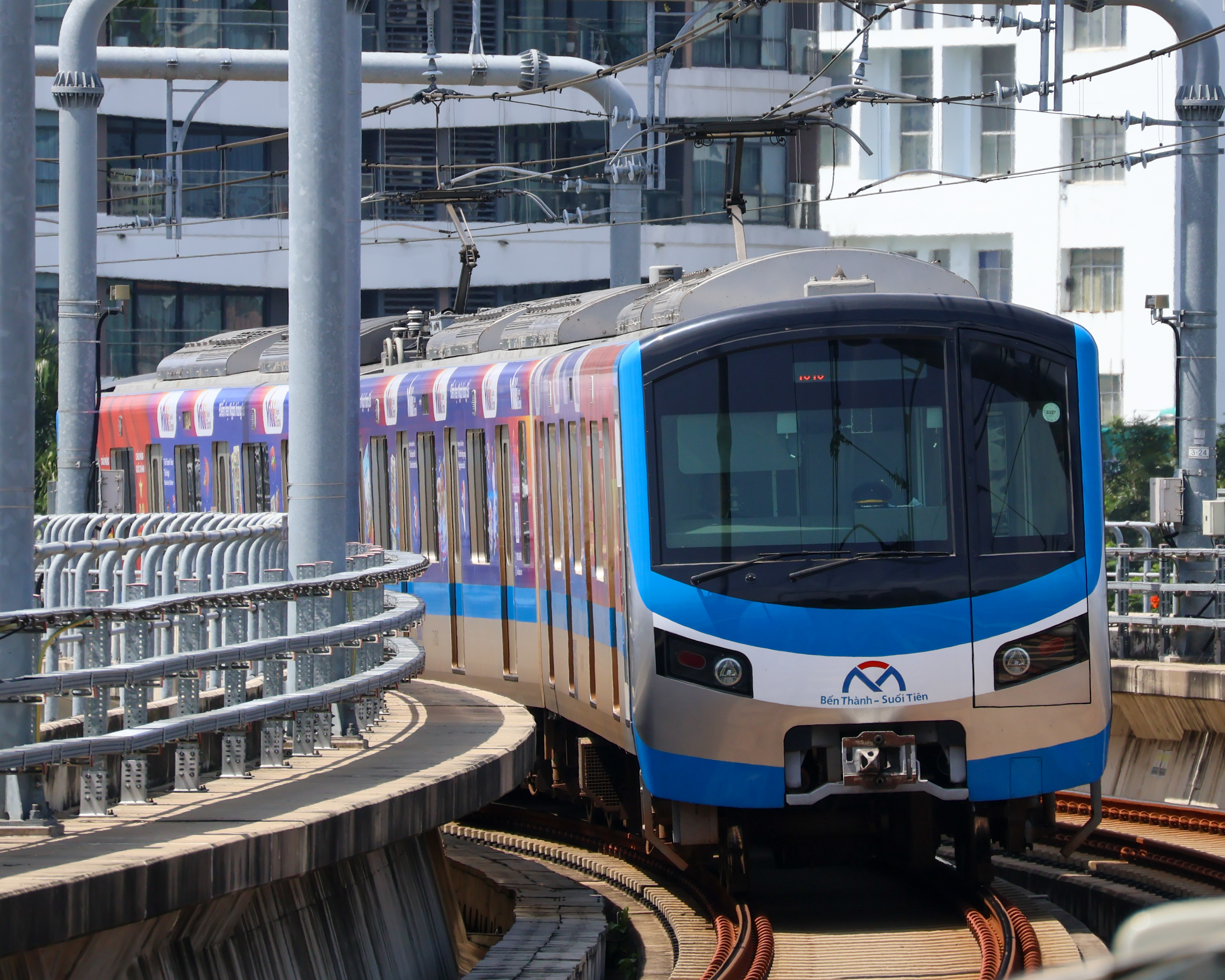
- A Line 1 train approaching Van Thanh Park station

Overview
- Native name: Tuyến 1
- Status: Operational
- Owner: Vietnam Railways - Management Authority for Urban Railways (MAUR)
- Locale: Ho Chi Minh City, Vietnam
- Termini: Ben Thanh; Suoi Tien Terminal
- Stations: 14
- Website: HCMC Metro Line 1 Guideline

Service
- Type: Rapid transit
- System: Ho Chi Minh City Metro
- Operator: HURC1
- Depot: Long Binh
- Rolling stock: Hitachi, 3 cars per train set
- Daily ridership: 56,326 (daily); ~110,000 (peak during Tet holiday)
- Ridership: 20,558,990 (2025)

History
- Opened: 22 December 2024 (1 year, 10 months and 2 days)

Technical
- Line length: 19.7 kilometers (12.2 mi)
- Number of tracks: 2
- Track gauge: 1,435 mm (4 ft 8 1/2 in) standard gauge
- Electrification: 1,500 V DC from overhead catenary
- Operating speed: 110 km/h (68 mph) elevated 80 km/h (50 mph) underground 35 km/h (22 mph) to station 25 km/h (16 mph) in station

Line 1 of the Ho Chi Minh City Metro (Vietnamese: Tuyến số 1 của hệ thống đường sắt đô thị Thành phố Hồ Chí Minh) is a rapid transit line in Ho Chi Minh City, Vietnam. It is the city's first metro line and the nation's first underground metro line, connecting the city center with the east side, including former District Bình Thạnh and Thủ Đức City.

Construction began in 2012, with an initial completion date set for 2018. However, the project's completion was delayed multiple times. The line was officially opened for service on 22 December 2024.

Ticket prices range from 7,000–20,000 VND (US$0.27–0.79) per trip or 6,000–19,000 VND (US$0.20–0.75) for cashless payments.

From the planning in 2024, Line 1 will be extended from Ben Thanh station to An Ha Depot, bringing the total length to 40.8 km.

== History ==
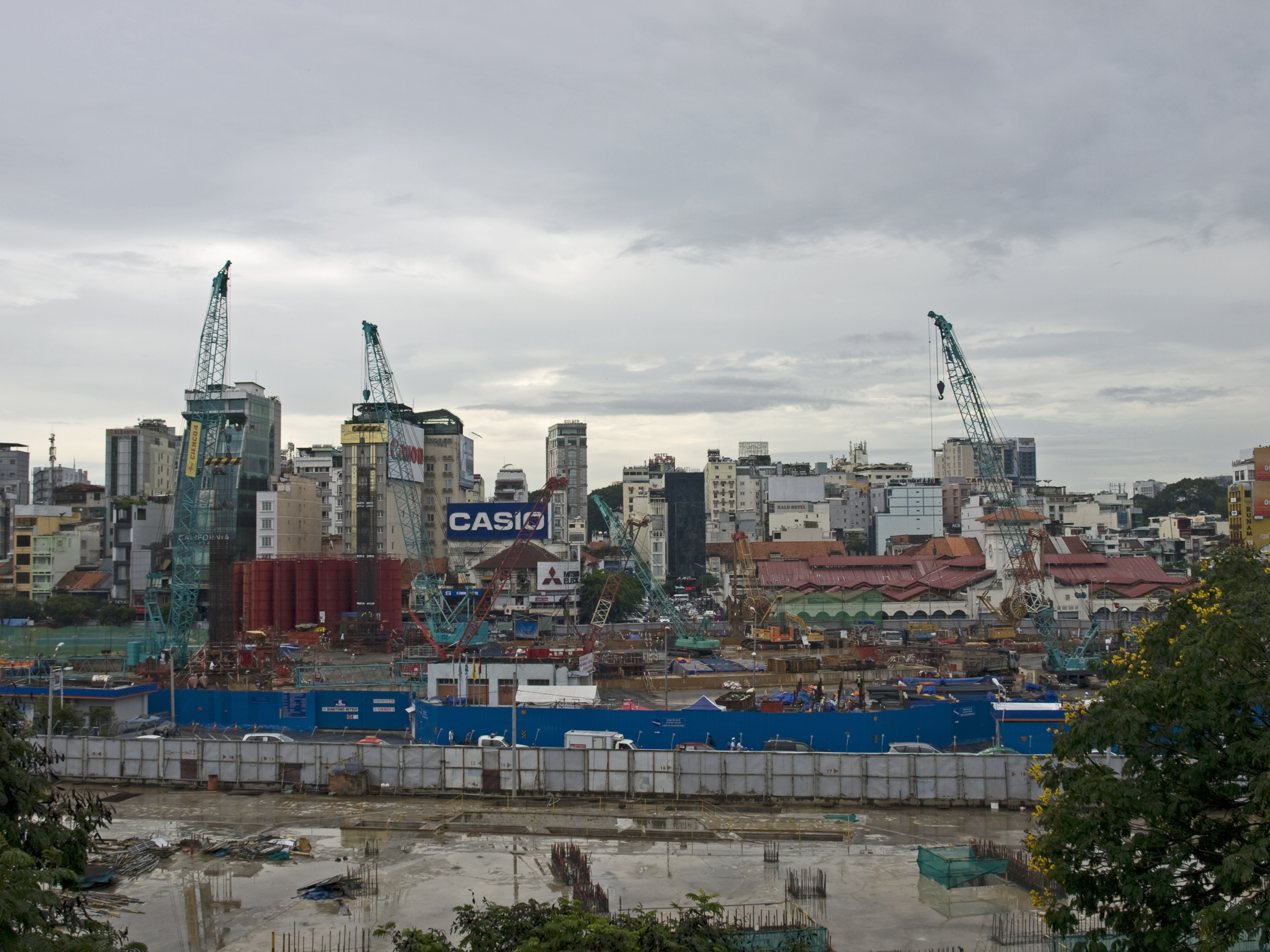
Construction for Ben Thanh station

The line was designed by Nippon Koei (now ID&E Holdings). The above-ground section was constructed by a joint venture between the Japanese rail corporation Sumitomo Group and Vietnamese state-owned corporation Cienco 6. The underground section was constructed by two Japanese companies, Shimizu Corporation and Maeda Corporation. 83% of the project finance was provided by Japanese government loans through Japan International Cooperation Agency (JICA), while the rest was provided by the Vietnamese government. Engineering surveys for the geometric control of the casting of the viaduct segments, as well as the erection of the spans, were handled by the joint venture of Freyssinet (part of Soletanche Freyssinet, through its parent company Vinci), VSL, and Rizzani de Eccher.

On 13 September 2017, the authorities announced that Line 1 would be delayed for two years. Cost overruns, audits, and delayed payments to contractors contributed to the delay. The targeted completion date was set for 2020. Planners expect the route to serve more than 160,000 passengers daily upon launch, increasing to 635,000 by 2030 and 800,000 by 2040. All stations along the route are expected to accommodate the disabled, with automatic ticket vending machines, telephone booths, restrooms, subway doors and information bulletins accessible to the handicapped and visually impaired.

HCMC Metro Line 1 Route sign at Opera House Station

On 28 January 2019, MAUR Director of Project Management Unit Dương Hữu Hòa stated that as of December 2018, construction progress of Line 1 had reached 62%, below the target of 65%. The project has been criticised by the local press for its repeated delays.

By August 2022, the line was 92% complete. 17 Hitachi train sets arrived and are undergoing testing.

By February 2024, the line was now 97.5% complete. Test runs have begun, and MAUR are planning for commercial use in Q4 2024.

On 22 December 2024, the line began service. Tickets to and from all stations were free until 20 January 2025. The first four days of the line's opening served 394,967 riders.

On 21 January 2025, the line began charging passengers.

== Route ==
=== East section: Bến Thành – Suối Tiên Line ===
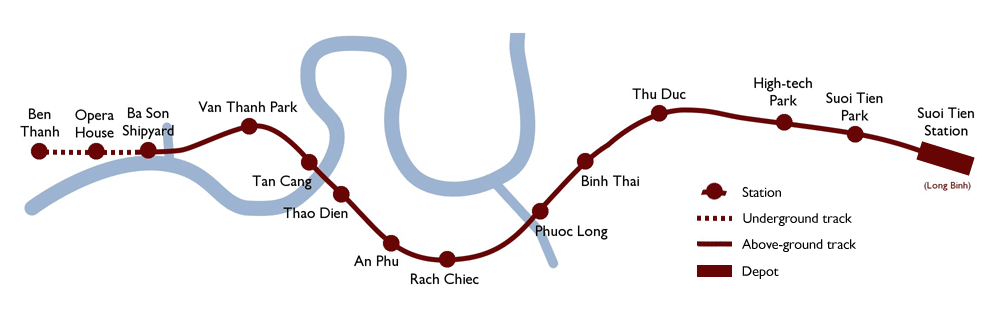
Bến Thành – Suối Tiên Line route map

The east section of the line, which is commonly referred as Bến Thành – Suối Tiên Line, begins at Bến Thành Market, running underground along Lê Lợi Boulevard, Lam Sơn Square and Nguyễn Siêu Street for 2.6 km (1.6 mi) from Ben Thanh station to Opera House station and Ba Son station at former site of Ba Son Shipyard (now is urban development), then transitions to an elevated section, spanning 17.1 km (10.6 mi) along Văn Thánh Canal and passes Saigon River to run along the left-hand side of Hanoi Highway (direction from Ho Chi Minh City to Đồng Nai), the metro line shifts to the right-hand side from National University station to Suoi Tien Terminal station, right at the front of New Eastern Bus Terminus and ends here.

=== West section: Bến Thành – An Hạ Line ===
According to the 2024 master plan, Line 1 will be extended from Ben Thanh Station to the An Ha Depot. The additional route begins near the An Hạ Canal in Vĩnh Lộc commune, follows Thanh Niên Road, then turns left to run parallel to Trần Hải Phụng Road toward Vinh Loc B. From there, the line continues straight to the Mã Lò – Lê Văn Qưới intersection, then proceeds along route of Lê Văn Qưới, Hòa Bình, Ông Ích Khiêm, Lãnh Binh Thăng, February 3rd and Lý Thái Tổ roads, reaching the Cộng Hòa 6-way Roundabout. From this junction, the line follows a segment of the former Line 3A route (the rest segment is now merged with former Line 3B to become Line 3), passing by Thai Binh Market, before arriving at Ben Thanh Station.

=== Bình Dương section and Đồng Nai section ===
After the 2025 Vietnamese administrative reforms, Line 1 (Suối Tiên – Bình Dương New City) of Bình Dương Metro has been merged into Ho Chi Minh City Metro. The Suối Tiên – Bình Dương New City line has a total length of 31.6 km (19.6 mi), the entire line will be elevated with the route of Suoi Tien Terminal station - Mỹ Phước – Tân Vạn Road (coincided with Ring Road 3 until Bình Chuẩn Bridge) - Provincial Road 742 - Bình Dương New City central station.

According to a proposal by the Đồng Nai Provincial People's Committee—submitted under an emergency directive in February 2026—Line 1 would be extended by 41.4 km (25.7 mi). Starting from the Tân Vạn area (Biên Hòa, Đồng Nai), then passes the Đồng Nai River, run along the Hanoi Highway (part of National Route 1 section) toward the new administrative center of Đồng Nai Centrally-governed City; follow the planned Bien Hoa–Long Thanh railway corridor and Provincial Road 771, and intersect the Ho Chi Minh City–Long Thanh–Dau Giay Expressway before reaching Long Thanh Airport.

Consequently, if these projects are implemented in accordance with the master plan, Line 1 will reach a total length of approximately 113.8 km (70.7 mi). It will consist of two branches—the original Bình Dương branch and the new Đồng Nai branch—linking the West–East axis of Ho Chi Minh City, facilitating inter-regional connectivity between Ho Chi Minh City and Đồng Nai, and serving as a transit route for passengers and cargo traveling between Long Thanh Airport and the city center.

Route of Ho Chi Minh City Metro Line 1

== Stations ==
The first three stations—Ben Thanh, Opera House, and Ba Son—are underground, while the remainder are on elevated track.

| Station symbol | Station name | | Layout | Metro transfers | Distance | | Location |
| Station symbol | English | Vietnamese | Layout | Metro transfers | between stations | in total | Location |
|---|---|---|---|---|---|---|---|
| L1 01 | Ben Thanh | Bến Thành | Underground | L1 extended (planned); L2 (under construction); L4 (planned); L12 (under construction) | – | 0.0 km (0 mi) | Bến Thành |
| L1 02 | Opera House | Nhà hát Thành phố | Underground | | 0.6 km (0.37 mi) | 0.6 km (0.37 mi) | Sài Gòn |
| L1 03 | Ba Son | | Underground | | 1.7 km (1.06 mi) | 2.3 km (1.43 mi) | Sài Gòn |
| L1 04 | Van Thanh Park | Công viên Văn Thánh | Elevated | | 1.2 km (0.75 mi) | 3.5 km (2.17 mi) | Thạnh Mỹ Tây |
| L1 05 | Tan Cang | Tân Cảng | Elevated | L5 (planned) | 0.9 km (0.56 mi) | 4.4 km (2.73 mi) | Thạnh Mỹ Tây |
| L1 06 | Thao Dien | Thảo Điền | Elevated | L5 (planned); L7 (planned) | 1.1 km (0.68 mi) | 5.5 km (3.42 mi) | An Khánh |
| L1 07 | An Phu | An Phú | Elevated | L5 (planned) | 1.0 km (0.62 mi) | 6.5 km (4.04 mi) | An Khánh |
| L1 08 | Rach Chiec | Rạch Chiếc | Elevated | | 1.7 km (1.06 mi) | 8.2 km (5.10 mi) | Bình Trưng |
| L1 09 | Phuoc Long | Phước Long | Elevated | L7 (planned) | 1.5 km (0.93 mi) | 9.7 km (6.03 mi) | Thủ Đức |
| L1 10 | Binh Thai | Bình Thái | Elevated | L6 (planned) | 1.3 km (0.81 mi) | 11.0 km (6.84 mi) | Thủ Đức |
| L1 11 | Thu Duc | Thủ Đức | Elevated | | 1.8 km (1.12 mi) | 12.8 km (7.95 mi) | Thủ Đức |
| L1 12 | High Tech Park | Khu Công nghệ cao | Elevated | L10 (planned) | 2.4 km (1.49 mi) | 15.2 km (9.44 mi) | Linh Xuân |
| L1 13 | National University | Đại học Quốc Gia | Elevated | | 1.5 km (0.93 mi) | 16.7 km (10.38 mi) | Linh Xuân |
| L1 14 | Suoi Tien Terminal | Bến xe Suối Tiên | Elevated | L1 extended (planned) | 3.0 km (1.86 mi) | 19.7 km (12.24 mi) | Đông Hòa |

== Fares ==
Line 1's fares are as follows:

Single journey ticket fares - cash payments (unit: thousand VND)
| Stations | Ben Thanh | Opera House | Ba Son | Van Thanh Park | Tan Cang | Thao Dien | An Phu | Rach Chiec | Phuoc Long | Binh Thai | Thu Duc | High Tech Park | National University | Suoi Tien Terminal |
|---|---|---|---|---|---|---|---|---|---|---|---|---|---|---|
| Ben Thanh | | 7 | 7 | 7 | 7 | 7 | 7 | 9 | 10 | 12 | 14 | 16 | 18 | 20 |
| Opera House | 7 | | 7 | 7 | 7 | 7 | 7 | 8 | 10 | 11 | 13 | 16 | 17 | 20 |
| Ba Son | 7 | 7 | | 7 | 7 | 7 | 7 | 7 | 9 | 10 | 12 | 15 | 16 | 18 |
| Van Thanh Park | 7 | 7 | 7 | | 7 | 7 | 7 | 7 | 7 | 8 | 10 | 13 | 14 | 17 |
| Tan Cang | 7 | 7 | 7 | 7 | | 7 | 7 | 7 | 7 | 7 | 9 | 12 | 13 | 16 |
| Thao Dien | 7 | 7 | 7 | 7 | 7 | | 7 | 7 | 7 | 7 | 8 | 10 | 12 | 14 |
| An Phu | 7 | 7 | 7 | 7 | 7 | 7 | | 7 | 7 | 7 | 7 | 9 | 11 | 13 |
| Rach Chiec | 9 | 8 | 7 | 7 | 7 | 7 | 7 | | 7 | 7 | 7 | 8 | 9 | 11 |
| Phuoc Long | 10 | 10 | 9 | 7 | 7 | 7 | 7 | 7 | | 7 | 7 | 7 | 8 | 10 |
| Binh Thai | 12 | 11 | 10 | 8 | 7 | 7 | 7 | 7 | 7 | | 7 | 7 | 7 | 8 |
| Thu Duc | 14 | 13 | 12 | 10 | 9 | 8 | 7 | 7 | 7 | 7 | | 7 | 7 | 7 |
| High Tech Park | 16 | 16 | 15 | 13 | 12 | 10 | 9 | 8 | 7 | 7 | 7 | | 7 | 7 |
| National University | 18 | 17 | 16 | 14 | 13 | 12 | 11 | 9 | 8 | 7 | 7 | 7 | | 7 |
| Suoi Tien Terminal | 20 | 20 | 18 | 17 | 16 | 14 | 13 | 11 | 10 | 8 | 7 | 7 | 7 | |

Other tickets
| Ticket types | | Price |
|---|---|---|
| Day ticket | 1-day | 40,000 VND/ticket |
| Day ticket | 3-day | 90,000 VND/ticket |
| Monthly pass (30 days of use) | Standard | 300,000 VND/pass |
| Monthly pass (30 days of use) | Students | 150,000 VND/pass |
