= Ho Chi Minh City University of Culture =

Coordinates: 10.8058°N 106.7311°E

- Vietnamese: Trường Đại học Văn hóa Thành phố Hồ Chí Minh
- Type: Public
- Established: 1 March 1976
- Affiliations: Ministry of Culture, Sports and Tourism
- President: Dr Trịnh Đăng Khoa
- Principal: Dr Lâm Nhân
- Academic staff: 78
- Undergraduates: 3327
- Postgraduates: 75
- Doctoral students: 15
- Other students: 54 (part-time students)
- Location: Thủ Đức, Ho Chi Minh city, Vietnam
- Campus: Urban, 34,702 m^{2} (8.575 acres) (across 2 campuses)
- Language: Vietnamese
- Website: hcmuc.edu.vn
- Location of the university’s headquarter (Campus 1)

Ho Chi Minh City University of Culture is a university in Thảo Điền, Thủ Đức, Ho Chi Minh City. This university includes programs for Journalism, Tourism, Museum Management, Information - Library Management, Culture Management, Folk Culture, Cultural Studies, Traditional Culture, and Asian Culture.
