= Vĩnh Lộc, Ho Chi Minh City =

Vĩnh Lộc Xã Vĩnh Lộc Vĩnh Lộc A
- Commune
- Interactive map of Vĩnh Lộc
- Coordinates: 10°49′23″N 106°33′36″E
- Country: Vietnam
- Municipality: Ho Chi Minh City
- Established: June 16, 2025

Area
  - Total: 11.80 sq mi (30.55 km^{2})

Population (2024)
  - Total: 167,521
  - Density: 14,200/sq mi (5,484/km^{2})
- Time zone: UTC+07:00 (Indochina Time)
- Administrative code: 27601

Vĩnh Lộc (Vietnamese: Xã Vĩnh Lộc) is a commune of Ho Chi Minh City, Vietnam. It is one of the 168 new wards, communes and special zones of the city following the reorganization in 2025.

== History ==
On June 16, 2025, the National Assembly Standing Committee issued Resolution No. 1685/NQ-UBTVQH15 on the arrangement of commune-level administrative units of Ho Chi Minh City in 2025 (effective from June 16, 2025). Accordingly, the entire land area and population of Vĩnh Lộc A commune and part of Phạm Văn Hai commune of the former Bình Chánh district will be integrated into a new commune named Vĩnh Lộc (Clause 113, Article 1).
