= Long Binh Depot =

Train depot in Ho Chi Minh City, Vietnam

Long Binh Depot Depot Long Bình
- Interactive map of Long Binh Depot; Depot Long Bình

Location
- Location: Long Bình, Ho Chi Minh City, Vietnam
- Coordinates: 10°52′41″N 106°49′19″E

Characteristics
- Operator: Management Authority of Urban Railways in Ho Chi Minh City
- Type: At-grade
- Routes served: L1

History
- Opened: 22 December 2024

Long Binh Depot (Vietnamese: Depot Long Bình) is a train depot located in Long Bình, Ho Chi Minh City, Vietnam. The 20 ha (49 acres) depot serves as the control center and maintenance yard for Line 1 of the Ho Chi Minh City Metro.
