= ID&E Holdings =

Japanese engineering consulting firm

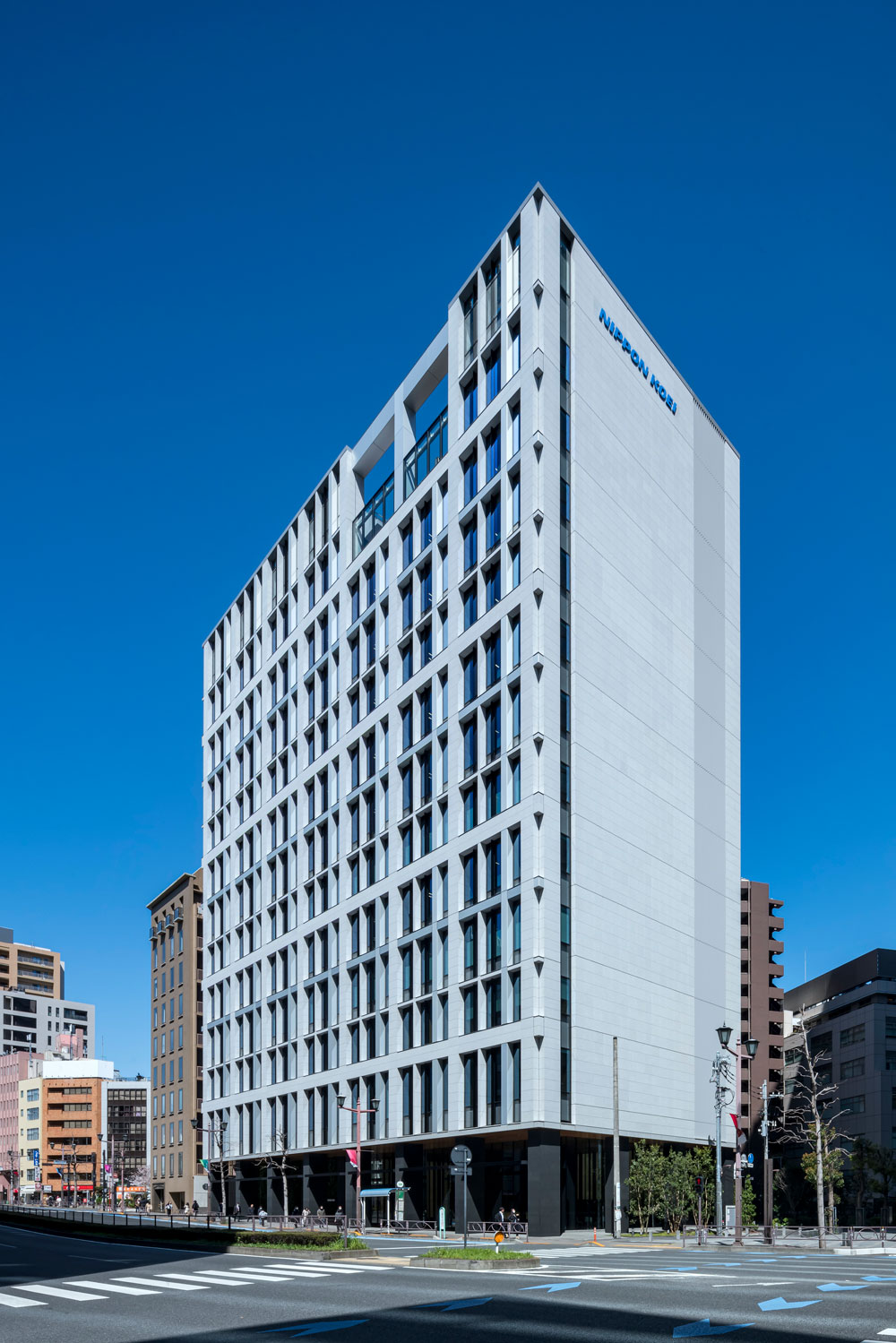
Nippon Koei Headquarters

ID&E Holdings (formerly Nippon Koei Co., Ltd. (日本工営株式会社)) is a Japanese engineering consulting company, founded on 7 June 7, 1946, and headquartered in Chiyoda, Tokyo, Japan. It is the oldest independent consulting firm in Japan.

It was founded by Yutaka Kubota.

ID&E Holdings was created as part of a company reorganisation in July 2023. It has numerous subsidiaries, the main ones including Nippon Koei Co Ltd, Nippon Koei Urban Space Co Ltd, Nippon Koei Energy Solutions Co Ltd, Nippon Koei Business Partners Co Ltd, and British architectural firm Building Design Partnership.
