= Ho Chi Minh City Metro =

Rapid transit system in Ho Chi Minh City, Vietnam

- Ho Chi Minh City Metro logo

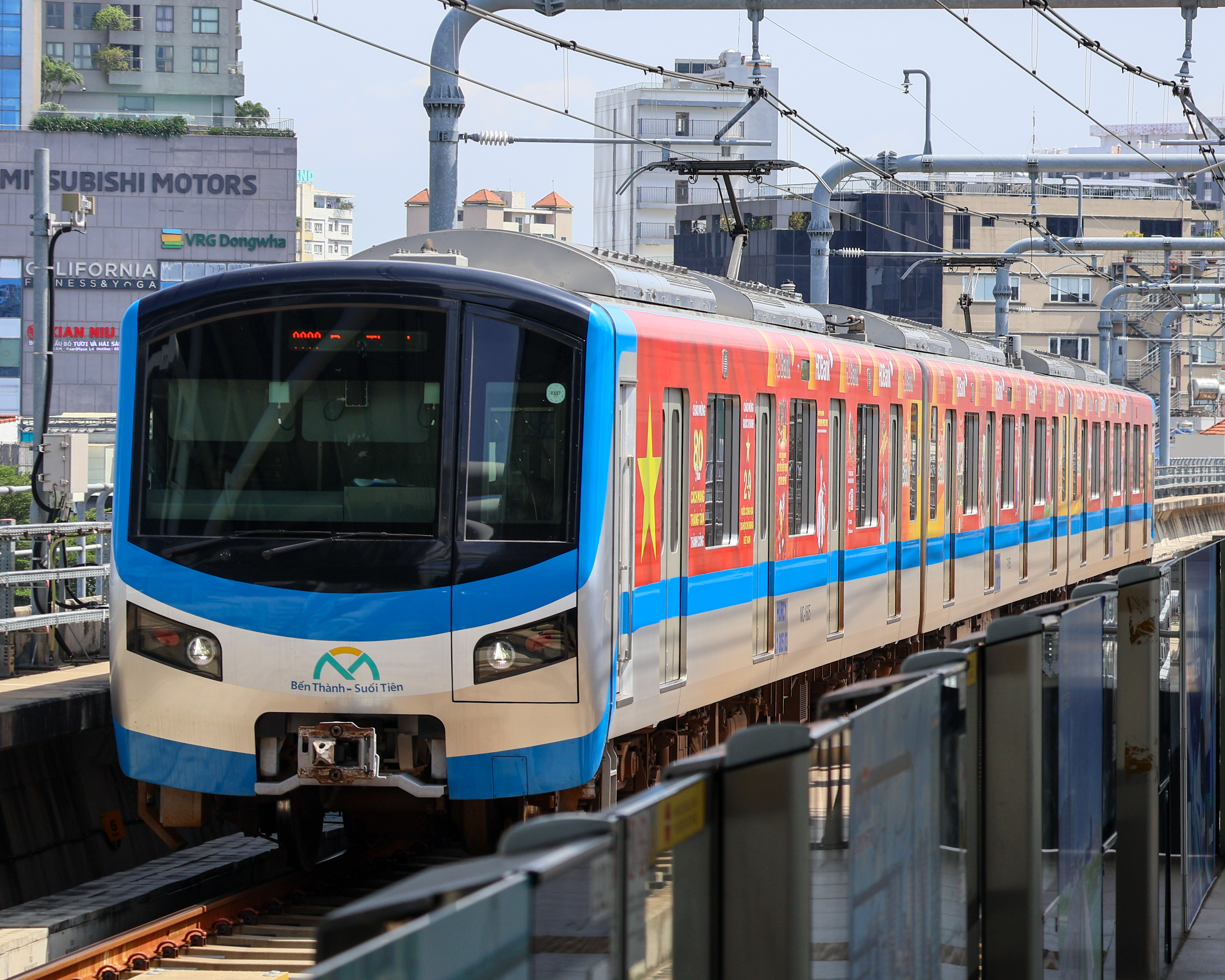
- A Line 1 train as seen from Văn Thánh

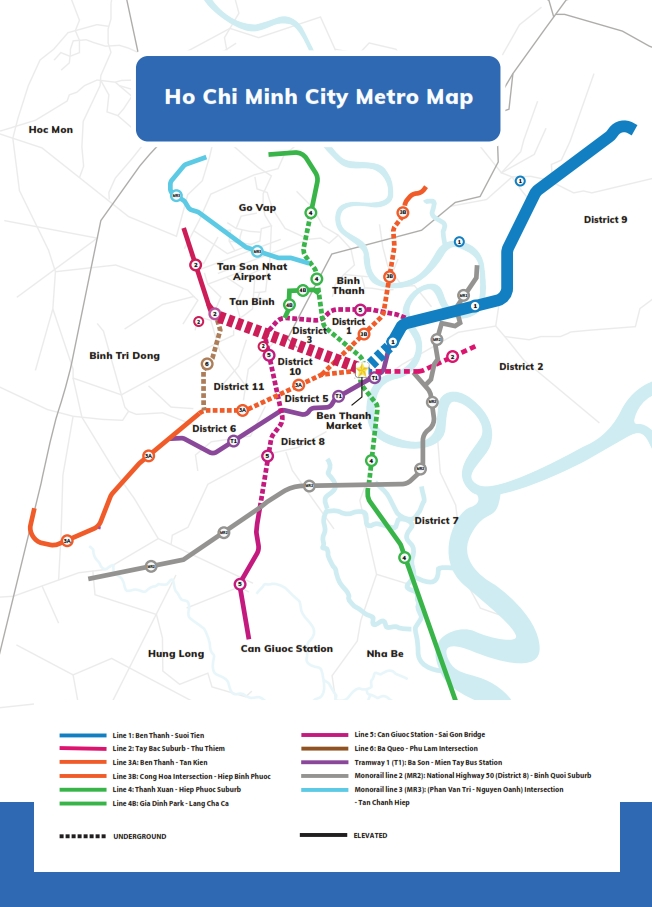
- Future map of Ho Chi Minh City Metro. Line 1 has commenced operations while Line 2 is under construction.

Overview
- Native name: Đường sắt đô thị Thành phố Hồ Chí Minh
- Owner: Management Authority for Urban Railways (MAUR)
- Locale: Ho Chi Minh City, Vietnam
- Transit type: Rapid transit
- Number of lines: 1 (operational); 2 (under construction); 12 (planned)
- Number of stations: 14 (operational)
- Annual ridership: 20.56 million (2025)
- Headquarters: 17A Road No.6, Tăng Nhơn Phú (Hiệp Phú, Thủ Đức)
- Website: MAUR; HURC

Operation
- Began operation: 22 December 2024; 22 months ago
- Operator: HCM Urban Railways (HURC)
- Character: Elevated and underground
- Number of vehicles: Line 1: 17 three-car Hitachi trains

Technical
- System length: 19.7 km (12.2 mi); 612.7 km (380.7 mi) (planned)
- Track gauge: 1,435 mm (4 ft 8 1/2 in) standard gauge
- Electrification: Overhead catenary
- Top speed: 110 km/h (68 mph)
System map
HCMC Metro map

The Ho Chi Minh City Metro (HCMC Metro; Vietnamese: Đường sắt đô thị Thành phố Hồ Chí Minh) is a rapid transit system in Ho Chi Minh City, the most populous city in Vietnam.

The system currently consists of one operational line, Line 1, which opened on 22 December 2024 from Bến Thành Market to New Eastern Bus Terminus. Additional lines are currently under construction or being planned. Line 1 is 19.7 km (12.2 mi) long with three underground stations (Ben Thanh, Opera House, and Ba Son) and eleven elevated stations. The three stations above are Vietnam's first underground metro stations. Trains are designed to travel at up to 110 km/h (68 mph) on the elevated sections and up to 80 km/h (50 mph) underground.

Further lines are under construction or planned, for a total length of 612.7 km (380.7 mi) (including the length of LRT Line 11 and Line 12 for Cần Giờ, not including the planned metro lines of former provinces Binh Duong and Ba Ria – Vung Tau, which were merged with HCMC in 2025).

As part of its inauguration, nine trains will initially run from 05:00 to 22:00 (UTC+07:00), with peak hour and off-peak frequencies of eight and twelve minutes, respectively. Based on the decision of the Ho Chi Minh City People's Council, the metro will remain free for the first 30 days of operation. Feeder bus lines connecting to Metro Line 1 will be free of charge from 1 January 2025, until the end of the metro's fare-free policy. In practice, however, the free bus fare policy was implemented earlier, starting on 22 December 2024, coinciding with the official operation of the metro line.

== History ==
=== Earlier proposals (2001–2012) ===
The network was first proposed in 2001 as part of a comprehensive public transport network plan including Ho Chi Minh City and neighbouring provinces, with the aim of avoiding the severe traffic congestion problems that have affected other Asian cities (such as Hanoi).

According to the original master plan submitted in February 2001, the metro system would comprise six lines. The plan was originally expected to cost US$1.5 billion over 10 years, as part of a US$3.35 billion program to build a rail network serving Ho Chi Minh City and surrounding provinces.

The plan was revised in 2007 and proposed no less than six urban rail lines. The city’s transport development master plan to 2020 envisages developing three monorail or light rail lines with a total length of 37 kilometres (23 mi) and six underground metro routes with a total length of 107 kilometres (66 mi). Bến Thành Market in District 1, already a major hub for bus traffic, will become a major hub connecting several lines.

=== Revised plan and construction (2013–present) ===
The latest plans for the Ho Chi Minh City Metro, a revised version of the earlier proposal in 2007, was approved on 8 April 2013. The network's first line, connecting Bến Thành Market and Suối Tiên Park in Thủ Đức, was originally scheduled for completion in 2014. A groundbreaking ceremony for Line 1 was held on 21 February 2008. Due to funding issues, however, construction only began in 2012, pushing the project completion date to 2018. Line 1 is mainly funded through official development assistance provided by the Japan International Cooperation Agency (JICA), with the remainder being financed by the city's government budget. Nippon Koei (now is ID&E Holdings) was the main designer and consultant for the line. The elevated sections were built by a joint venture between Japanese conglomerate Sumitomo and Vietnamese state-owned contractor Cienco 6. The underground section is being built by a joint venture between two other Japanese companies, Shimizu and Maeda.

In September 2013, an agreement was reached with the Asian Development Bank, the European Investment Bank, and the Spanish Government to provide €850 million to finance the construction of Line 5, with any additional cost funded by the Vietnamese Government. A revised construction start of 2015 was provided.

On 13 September 2017, the authorities announced that Line 1 will be delayed for two years. Cost overrun, audits, and delayed payments to contractors contributed to the delay. The targeted completion date was set at 2020. Planners expect the route to serve more than 160,000 passengers daily upon launch, increasing to 635,000 by 2030 and 800,000 by 2040. All stations along the route are expected to accommodate the disabled, with automatic ticket vending machines, telephone booths, restrooms, subway doors and information bulletins accessible to the handicapped and visually impaired.

Construction of Line 2 was initially scheduled to begin in 2013, with operations beginning in 2018. Nonetheless, on 13 September 2017, the local authorities have requested to the Prime Minister to push back the construction of the second line to 2020 with completion in 2024.

On 28 January 2019, the Director of Project Management Unit at MAUR, stated that as of December 2018, construction progress of Line 1 has reached 62%, below the target of 65%. The project has been criticised by the local press for its repeated delays.

In February 2020, the expected opening date for the first line was scheduled for the end of 2021. No reason was given for the delay. The estimated cost of the line has also ballooned from $1.3 billion to more than $2.1 billion. In December 2020, it was reported that one of the Elastomeric Laminated Bearing pads, which hold up the concrete beams of the viaducts for Line 1, had fallen off, causing one of the beams to be displaced and crack. Research on the incident is still being done by the contractor.

In February 2021, first metro line completion line was pushed back to 2022. On 8 September 2021, the Management Authority for Urban Railways (MAUR) announced that Line 1 will be further delayed. Construction was expected to be completed in late 2023, with commercial operations beginning in 2024.

In November 2023, Indian investors plan to develop nine metro lines, which would cost a total of VND437 trillion ($19 billion), according to the India Business Forum.

On 14 March 2024, MAUR announced that Line 1 would not be operational until the fourth quarter of 2024. During that same year, PowerChina, the Chinese giant, was in discussions with the government to develop railways, which included metro lines in Ho Chi Minh City.

On 21 November 2024, MAUR announced that Line 1 was "expected to enter operation" on 22 December 2024.

On 22 December 2024, Line 1 services commenced at 10:00 (UTC+07:00) connecting Bến Thành and Suối Tiên.

On 19 December 2025, Line 12 (Bến Thành to Cần Giờ) began construction.

After long delays, on 15 January 2026, the groundbreaking ceremony for Line 2 (Bến Thành to Tham Lương) was held, and was then followed by the groundbreaking ceremony for Line 2 (Bến Thành to Thủ Thiêm) on 29 April. Both parts are expected to commence service in 2030.

== Lines ==
According to the Project of Urban railway system development draft that was approved by the People's Council of Ho Chi Minh City in 2024 and Decision No. 1711/QD-TTg approved by the Prime Minister on 31 December 2024, the Ho Chi Minh City Metro System includes:

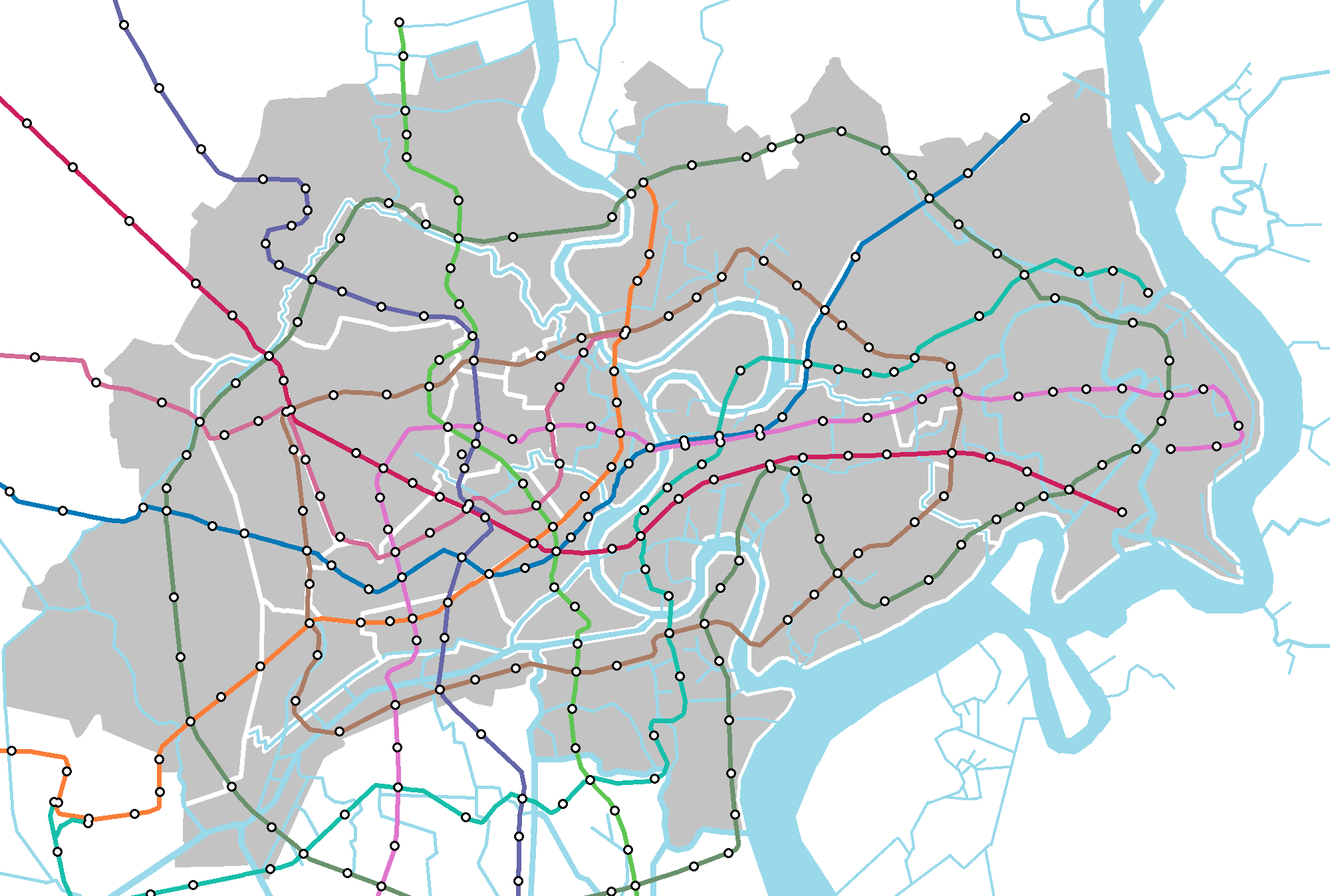
Planned network of the Ho Chi Minh City Metro (2024 planning)

Line	Line name	Length	Stations	Route	Depots	Note
Mass Rail Transit (MRT)
L1	Line 1	40.8 km	30	An Hạ (Bình Chánh) ↔ Ben Thanh ↔ Suoi Tien Terminal	An Hạ; Long Bình	Operational (Bến Thành – Suối Tiên segment with 14 stations) Planned with extensions from Suối Tiên Terminal to Bình Dương New City and Long Thành International Airport
L2	Line 2	62.2 km	8	Sông Tắc Terminal ↔ Thủ Thiêm	Long Trường	Planned, with extension from Thủ Thiêm to Long Thành International Airport
L2	Line 2	62.2 km	17	Thủ Thiêm ↔ Ben Thanh ↔ Tham Lương	Tham Lương; Phước Hiệp	Under construction
L2	Line 2	62.2 km	24	Tham Lương ↔ Củ Chi	Tham Lương	Planned
L2	Line 2	62.2 km	12	An Hạ (Củ Chi) ↔ Bình Mỹ	Bình Mỹ	Planned
L3	Line 3	32.5 km	27	An Hạ (Bình Chánh) ↔ Tân Kiên ↔ Cộng Hoà Junction ↔ Tao Đàn	An Hạ; Tân Kiên; Hiệp Bình Phước	Planned with extension from Tao Đàn to Thủ Dầu Một
L4	Line 4	47.3 km	37	Đông Thạnh ↔ Tân Sơn Nhất International Airport ↔ Hiệp Phước	Đông Thạnh; Hiệp Phước	Planned
L5	Line 5	53.9 km	39	Sông Tắc Terminal ↔ Tan Cang ↔ Bảy Hiền ↔ Hưng Long	Long Trường; Đa Phước	Planned; Tan Cang – An Phu stretch coincides with Line 1.
L6	Line 6 (Inner Ring Line)	53.8 km	43	Phú Hữu ↔ Bình Triệu ↔ Bà Quẹo ↔ Phú Lâm Junction ↔ Bình Hưng ↔ Phú Hữu	Bình Hưng	Planned
L7	Line 7	51.2 km	36	Tân Kiên ↔ Nguyễn Văn Linh (District 7) ↔ Thanh Đa ↔ Vinhomes Grand Park (Phước Thiện)↔ Long Bình	Tân Kiên; Long Bình	Planned
L8	Line 8	42.8 km	40	Đa Phước ↔ Hòa Hưng ↔ Gò Vấp ↔ Tân Chánh Hiệp ↔ Bình Mỹ	Đa Phước; Tân Chánh Hiệp; Bình Mỹ	Planned
L9	Line 9	28.3 km	23	Bình Triệu ↔ Hòa Hưng ↔ Âu Cơ ↔ An Hạ (Bình Chánh)	An Hạ	Planned
L10	Line 10 (Outer Ring Line)	83.9 km	69	Thủ Thiêm ↔ Cát Lái ↔ High Tech Park ↔ Tham Lương ↔ Phong Phú ↔ Thủ Thiêm	Thạnh Mỹ Lợi; Tham Lương	Planned
Tramway
L11	Line 11 (Riverside Line)	48.7 km	Unknown	Western Bus Terminus (Bình Tân) ↔ Lý Chiêu Hoàng ↔ Võ Văn Kiệt ↔ Mê Linh Square ↔ Tôn Đức Thắng ↔ Ba Son ↔ Saigon Riverside Road ↔ Củ Chi	Trung An	Planned
High Speed Rail (HSR)
L12	Line 12 (Cần Giờ Line)	53.8 km	6	Ben Thanh ↔ Nguyễn Tất Thành (District 4) ↔ Tân Thuận (District 7) ↔ Tân Mỹ (District 7) ↔ Street 15B (Nhà Bè) ↔ Bình Khánh (Cần Giờ district) ↔ Cần Giờ Mangrove Forest ↔ Cần Giờ Coastal Urban Planning	Tân Thuận; Nhà Bè; Cần Giờ	Under construction
Total		612.7 km				

== Rolling stock ==
Line 1 uses 17 trains supplied by Hitachi Rail. Each train consists of three cars, holding up to 930 people in total (147 seated and 789 standing passengers). Each trainset is 61.3 m (201 ft) long, operates at 110 km/h (70 mph) on standard-gauge elevated rail track and 80 km/h (50 mph) on underground rail track. They are powered by a 1.5 kV DC overhead line.

== Fares and ticketing ==
The Ho Chi Minh City Management Authority for Urban Railways (MAUR) have introduced a smart card for use on the Ho Chi Minh City Metro. The smart card will use Sony's FeliCa contactless IC chip, equipping it with NFC technology. Two types of smart cards are available at launch including a top-up card, which has a red design and a single-journey card, which has a blue design.

Fares on the Ho Chi Minh City Metro are based on travel distance. For distances between 0 to 5 kilometers, the fare will be set at VND12,000, while distances exceeding 15 kilometers will have a fare of VND18,000. These fare rates will be applicable when Line 1 becomes operational, and will remain applicable for a minimum of three years and a maximum of five years.

The metro will remain free during the first 30 days of service, after which single fares will cost between VND7,000 (US$0.27) and VND20,000 (US$0.8). Contactless payments will be slightly discounted. Unlimited daily tickets cost VND40,000 (US$1.6), three-day tickets cost VND90,000 (US$3.5), and monthly tickets are priced at VND300,000 (US$11.8) or VND150,000 (US$5.9) for students.

== Ridership ==
Year	Annual ridership	Avg. daily ridership	Ref.
2025	20,463,587	56,056	
2024 (Note: Line 1 started operations on 22 December 2024. The statistics represent the 10-day period that the line was operational in 2024.)	1,100,000	110,000	

== See also ==
- Transport in Vietnam
- Hanoi Metro
