= Suoi Tien Terminal station =

Metro station in Ho Chi Minh City, Vietnam

Coordinates: 10.8795°N 106.8140°E

L1 14 Suoi Tien Terminal Bến xe Suối Tiên
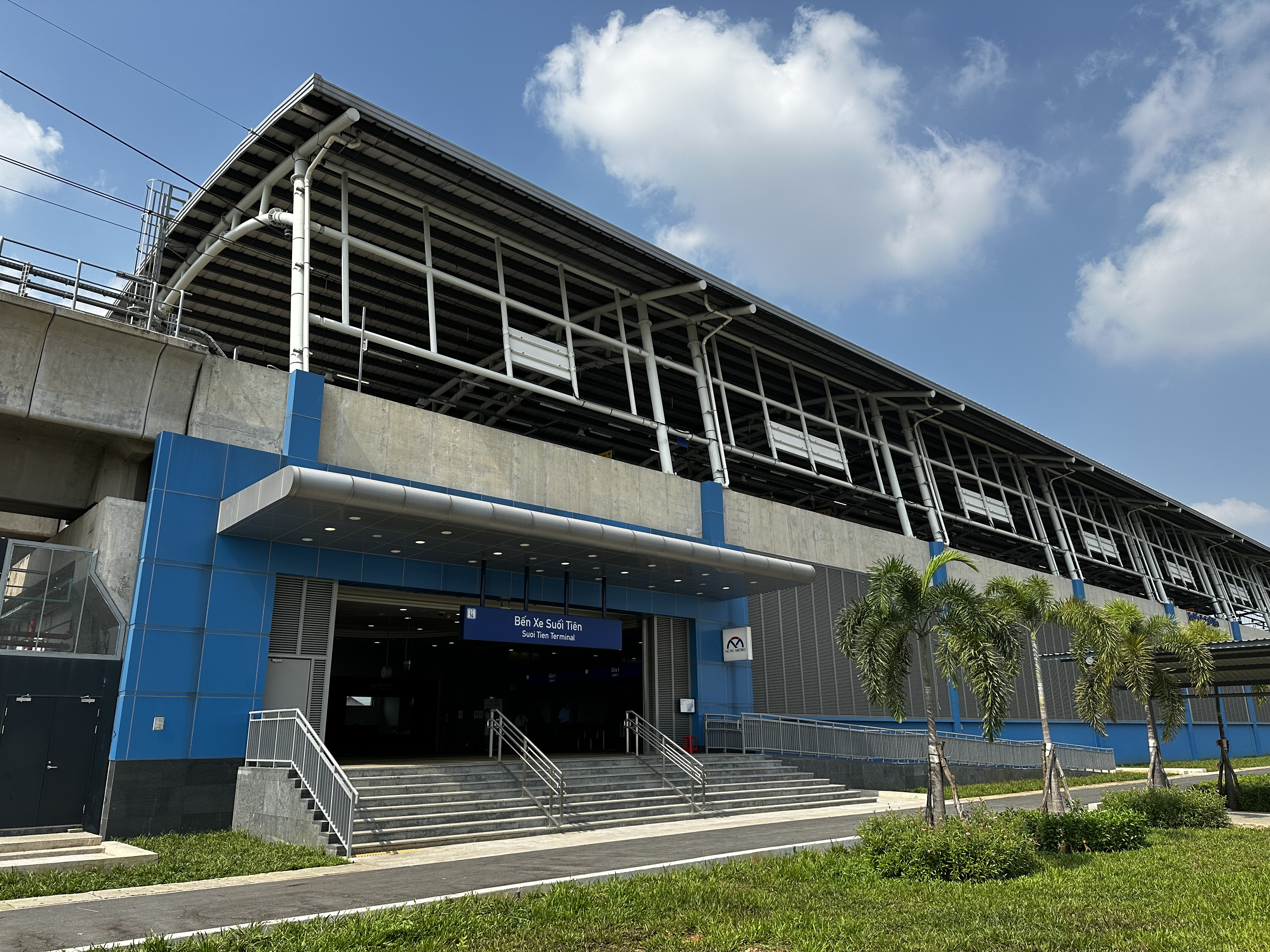

General information
- Location: Hanoi Highway, Long Bình & Đông Hòa, Ho Chi Minh City
- System: Ho Chi Minh City Metro station
- Line: L1

Construction
- Structure type: Elevated

Other information
- Status: Completed

History
- Opened: 22 December 2024

Services
Preceding station	Ho Chi Minh City Metro	Following station
National University L1 13 towards Ben Thanh	Line 1	Terminus
Route map
Location

Suối Tiên Terminal station (Vietnamese: Ga Bến xe Suối Tiên) is an elevated Ho Chi Minh City Metro terminus station for Line 1, and for Line 1 of Bình Dương Metro and Đồng Nai Metro in the future. Located at the New Eastern Bus Terminus in Dĩ An, Bình Dương Province (now is Đông Hòa, Ho Chi Minh City), the station opened on 22 December 2024.

== Station layout ==
1F; Platform	Platform 1	← L1 Line 1 to National University (for Ben Thanh)
1F; Platform	Island platform, doors will open on the left
1F; Platform	Platform 2	← L1 Line 1 to National University (for Ben Thanh)
GF	Ground floor	Entrances/exits, ticket sales area, commercial area, technical department area, platform gates & ticket gates

== Surrounding area ==
Ho Chi Minh City Martyrs' Cemetery

- New Eastern Bus Terminus
- Ho Chi Minh City Martyrs' Cemetery
- Bình An Cemetery
- Bửu Long Temple
- Thủ Đức Golf Course
- National Historical and Cultural Park
- Long Binh Depot
- BCONS Suối Tiên Apartment
- BCONS Miền Đông Apartment Building
- Lycée Français International Marguerite Duras
- Vietnam National University, Ho Chi Minh City
  - Dormitory Area A
  - Sports and Physical Training Center
  - Campus 2 of Ho Chi Minh City University of Technology
