= Tôn Đức Thắng Boulevard =

Boulevard in Ho Chi Minh City, Vietnam

- Bạch Đằng Quay (Bến Bạch Đằng)
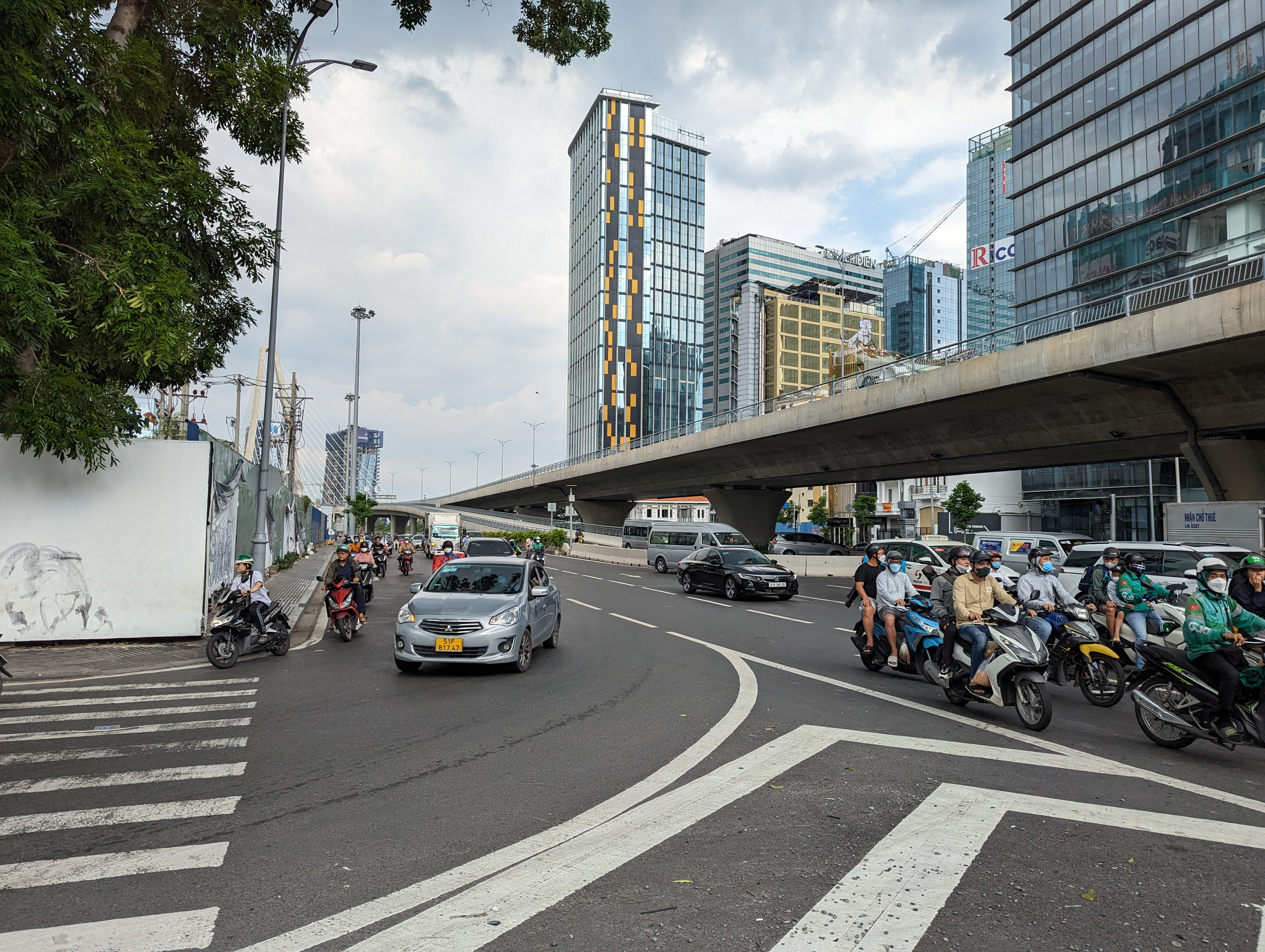
- Ton Duc Thang Boulevard and the Ba Son Bridge in 2023
- Interactive map of Tôn Đức Thắng Boulevard
- Native name: Đường Tôn Đức Thắng (Vietnamese)
- Former name: Cường Để Boulevard (Note: Stretch from Saigon River to intersection of Lê Duẩn - Đinh Tiên Hoàng)
- Namesake: Tôn Đức Thắng
- Owner: Ho Chi Minh City
- Length: 2 km (1.2 mi)
- Width: 18m (roadway); 5-7m (each pavement)
- Location: Saigon, District 1, Ho Chi Minh City
- Nearest metro station: Ba Son station; Hoa Lư station (proposed); Mê Linh station (proposed)
- Coordinates: 10°46′39″N 106°42′25″E
- North end: Lê Duẩn Boulevard
- Major junctions: Nguyễn Hữu Cảnh Boulevard; Mê Linh Square; Đồng Khởi Street; Nguyễn Huệ Boulevard
- South end: Hàm Nghi Boulevard & Khánh Hội Bridge

Tôn Đức Thắng Boulevard (Vietnamese: Đường Tôn Đức Thắng) is a thoroughfare in District 1, Downtown Ho Chi Minh City, Vietnam.

The boulevard stretches from Lê Duẩn Boulevard to the north end of the Khánh Hội Bridge, with more than half of its length running along the west bank of the Saigon River.

== History ==
Present-day Tôn Đức Thắng Boulevard incorporates Saigon's two colonial streets.

The first street was from the river bank to the former citadel of Saigon. On 17 February 1859, the French Indochina troops took this street to capture Saigon. In 1865, it was named boulevard de la Citadelle. This name lasted until 1901, when the artery was renamed boulevard Luro. The boulevard runs alongside the Saigon Naval Shipyard and the buildings of the naval barracks in its southeastern part. In 1955, the boulevard was renamed Cường Để Boulevard, named after the 20th century Vietnam revolutionary Cường Để, by the government of South Vietnam. Following the 1963 South Vietnamese coup d'état, the Cộng Hòa Barracks (now is buildings of Ho Chi Minh City University of Medicine and Pharmacy and VNU-HCM USSH) were demolished and Cường Để Boulevard was extended as far as Hồng Thập Tự Street (present-day Nguyễn Thị Minh Khai Street). In August 1975, it became part of the Đinh Tiên Hoàng Boulevard, which then stretched from Saigon River, cross the Nhieu Loc–Thi Nghe Channel by Bông Bridge, all the way to Bình Hòa and Bà Chiểu (now Gia Định ward), the provincial capital of former Gia Định province with its administrative hall, now is Bình Thạnh administrative center.

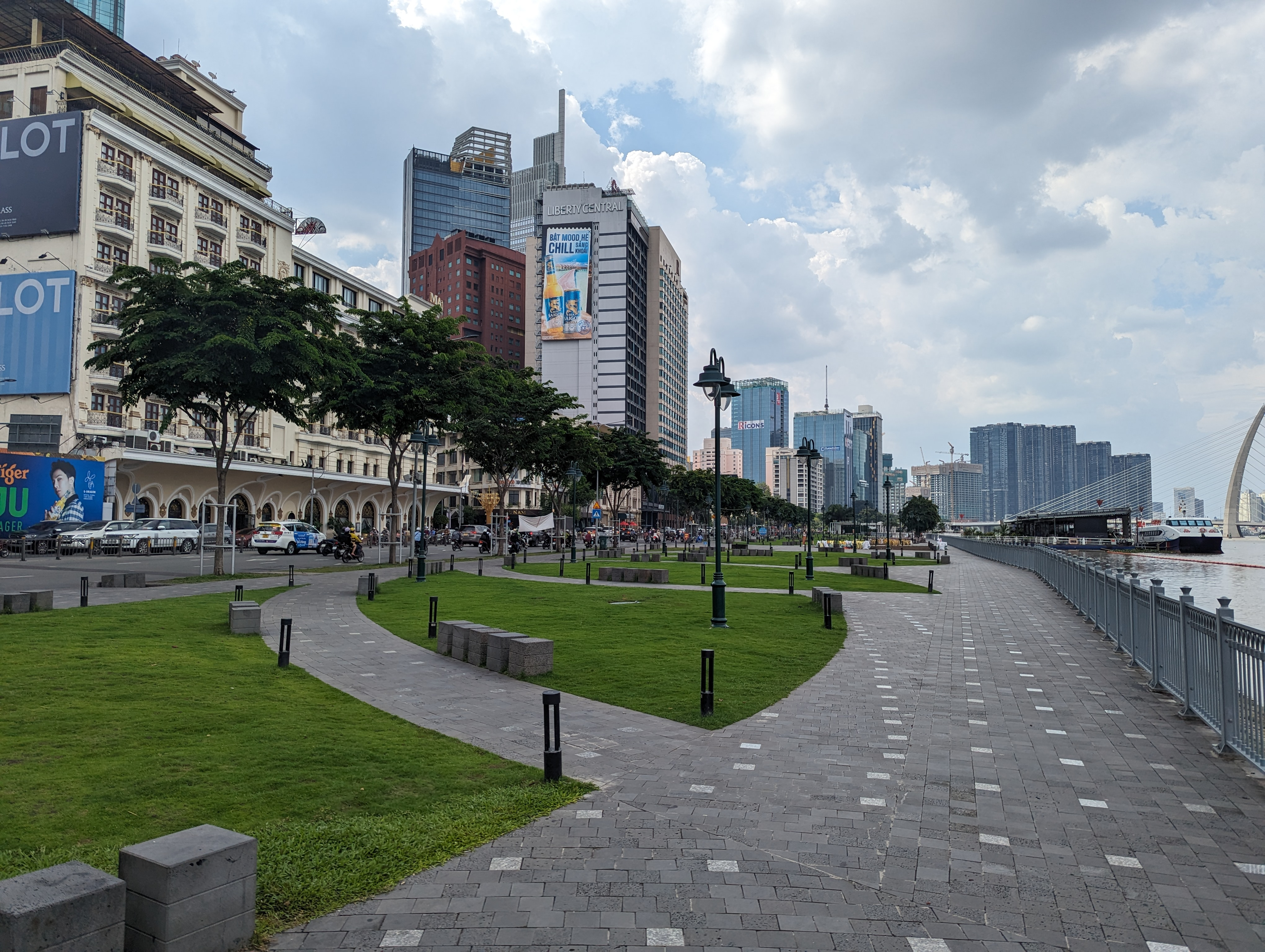
The Bach Dang Quay Park, Saigon River waterfront, with Ton Duc Thang Boulevard on the left in 2023

The second street ran along the bank of Saigon River, it is further separated into two parts, then known as the quays, by the Place Rigault de Genouilly (present-day Mê Linh Square). The southern quay had its name changed quite often throughout the French colonial period. Initially quai de Donnai, the name of the quay was successively changed to quai Napoléon (1865), quai du Commerce (1870), quai Francis Garnier (1896) and finally quai le Myre de Vilers (1920). The northern quay, located immediately in front of the naval barracks, also had two different names, initially quai Primauguet and then changed to quai d'Argonne in 1920. In 1955, both quays were given a single name, Bạch Đằng Quay (Bến Bạch Đằng), by the South Vietnamese government.

In 1980, the Bạch Đằng Quay and a section of Đinh Tiên Hoàng Boulevard (former Cường Để Boulevard) was named Tôn Đức Thắng Boulevard to commemorate the second president of Vietnam, Tôn Đức Thắng, who passed earlier that year and was closely associated with the Ba Son Shipyard in Saigon, where he organized and led the workers' movement, most notably the historic strike of 1925.

== Buildings ==
List of notable buildings on the throughfare, starts from Lê Duẩn Boulevard to Khánh Hội Bridge. Buildings with addresses not on Tôn Đức Thắng Boulevard are on the corner streets with the boulevard.

Address	Alternative name	Image	Notable tenants, users and notes
Ba Son Complex
No. 2 Tôn Đức Thắng	Marina Central Saigon		
No. 2 Tôn Đức Thắng	Grand Marina Saigon – Residences by Marriott International		
No. 2 Tôn Đức Thắng	UOB Vietnam Plaza		UOB. Planned, not built yet
No. 2 Tôn Đức Thắng	Vinhomes Golden River		
No. 2 Tôn Đức Thắng	Ba Son Traditional House		
Former Cường Để Boulevard
15 Lê Duẩn Boulevard	Petrolimex Saigon	Nga tu Le duan va Ton Duc thang, phuong Bến Nghé, Quận 1, TPHCM, Việt Nam - panoramio	Initially used by the Compagnie Franco-Asiatique des Pétroles then Shell plc as their headquarters in Vietnam
6B Tôn Đức Thắng	Audi Ho Chi Minh City	Ton Duc Thang Boulevard, Saigon (53175235174)	
6 Tôn Đức Thắng	Saint Joseph Seminary of Saigon Archdiocese		
6bis Tôn Đức Thắng	Saigon Archdiocesan Pastoral Center	Archdiocesan Pastoral Center of Saigon (20230705 1531)	
4 Tôn Đức Thắng	Sisters of St. Paul of Chartres convent	District 1 Saigon 61	
4 Tôn Đức Thắng	Saigon University – Campus 2		Faculty of Kindergarten Pedagogy
37 Tôn Đức Thắng	Saigon Trade Center	Saigon Trade Center 21112013	Prudential plc, Chinese Visa Application Service Center, Standard Chartered. It was the tallest building in Vietnam in 1997–2010
35 Tôn Đức Thắng	Green Power Tower	Saigon Trade Center, bến nghé, quận 1, thành phố hồ chí minh	Vietnam Electricity, Hanjin Global Logistics
33 Tôn Đức Thắng	Carmelite Monastery of Saigon	Ton Duc Thang street-Bến Nghé, Quận 1, TPHCM, Việt Nam - panoramio	
29 Tôn Đức Thắng	VFC Tower		
9–11 Tôn Đức Thắng	Lim Tower	ThapCauThuThiem2	Manulife, Consulate General of Hungary; also known as 9 Tôn Đức Thắng Tower or Lim Tower 1.
First part of Bạch Đằng Quay
1–1A Tôn Đức Thắng	The Waterfront Saigon		The Ascott Limited, Starbucks
3A–3B Tôn Đức Thắng	VietCapital Center		Nobu Hotel & Restaurant Ho Chi Minh, The Vertex Private Residences
3A–3B Tôn Đức Thắng	The Nexus		J.P. Morgan & Co., L'Oréal, Keyence. Initially named as The Nexus 2
3A–3B Tôn Đức Thắng	The Kross		Initially named as The Nexus 3, then formerly known as The Lotus Tower
3A–3B Tôn Đức Thắng	Riverfront Financial Centre		VPBank [vi]. Initially named as The Nexus 1, then formerly known as VPBank Tower Saigon
3C Tôn Đức Thắng	Riverbank Place	Riverbank Place Building	Le Méridien Saigon Hotel, Mirae Asset Securities
2A–4A Tôn Đức Thắng	Lotte Hotel Saigon		Crystal Jade. Originally was Legend Saigon Hotel in 2001, then added the prefix "Lotte" after being sold in 2013 and changed to the current name in 2020
2A–4A Tôn Đức Thắng	Saigon Riverside Office Center		EVA Air, Shinhan Bank
4B Tôn Đức Thắng	Hoa Lâm Building		Eximbank
5B Tôn Đức Thắng	The Landmark		MUFG
5 Tôn Đức Thắng	Tôn Đức Thắng Museum	BT TĐT	
1A (or 5A) Tôn Đức Thắng	Vietnam People's Naval Army Barracks	Naval barracks, Saigon (20230705 1512)	Kiosk of Egg Coffee 3T
Mê Linh Square to Khánh Hội Bridge
1A Mê Linh Square	IBC Building		Sanyo, Metrang Coffee, GS25
3 Mê Linh Square & 2–4–6 Hai Bà Trưng	Saigon Melinh Tower	Công trường Mê linh-Bến Nghé, Quận 1, TPHCM, Việt Nam - panoramio (1)	On hold and canceled, temporaily used by Rạn Biển City Center Restaurant while waiting for re-auction
5 Mê Linh Square	Vietcombank Tower		Vietcombank, GS Energy, Heineken N.V., Hoa Sen Group, Idemitsu Kosan, Petrovietnam, Johnson & Johnson, Sun Life Financial, Shiseido, Sojitz, Pernod Ricard Vietnam
11 Mê Linh Square	Hilton Hotel Saigon	View from Saigon Riverside Park 2024-01-24 3	Lamborghini showroom
2 Ngô Đức Kế	Melinh Point		Frasers Property, Regus, VIB
8–15 Tôn Đức Thắng	Renaissance Riverside Hotel Saigon		
17 Tôn Đức Thắng	Liberty Central Saigon Riverside Hotel		
18–19–20 Tôn Đức Thắng	Riverside Hotel Saigon	Riverside Hotel P1310979	Saigonbank [vi]
2–4–6 Đồng Khởi	Seaprodex Building	Ton duc thang, Dong khoi street, ben thanh, district 1, hcmcity - panoramio	Jumbo Seafood, Casa Đồng Khởi, RuNam
1 Đồng Khởi and 2–4–6 Nguyễn Huệ	Hotel Majestic Saigon		
21 Tôn Đức Thắng	Ho Chi Minh City Customs Department	Ho Chi Minh City Customs Department	The entrance on this boulevard is Gate C. Main gate address is 2 Hàm Nghi Blvd
34–34A Tôn Đức Thắng	IFC One Saigon	Cầu Khánh Hội (52352824731)	
10B Tôn Đức Thắng	Bạch Đằng Quay		Saigon Waterbus, Starbucks Waterbus Bạch Đằng, Katinat Bạch Đằng Quay, ROS Yacht Club

== See also ==
- Mê Linh Square
- Ba Son Bridge
