= Hotel Majestic (Saigon) =

Hotel in Ho Chi Minh City, Vietnam

Coordinates: 10°46′23″N 106°42′22″E

Hotel Majestic Saigon
- Khách sạn Majestic Sài Gòn; Khách sạn Cửu Long
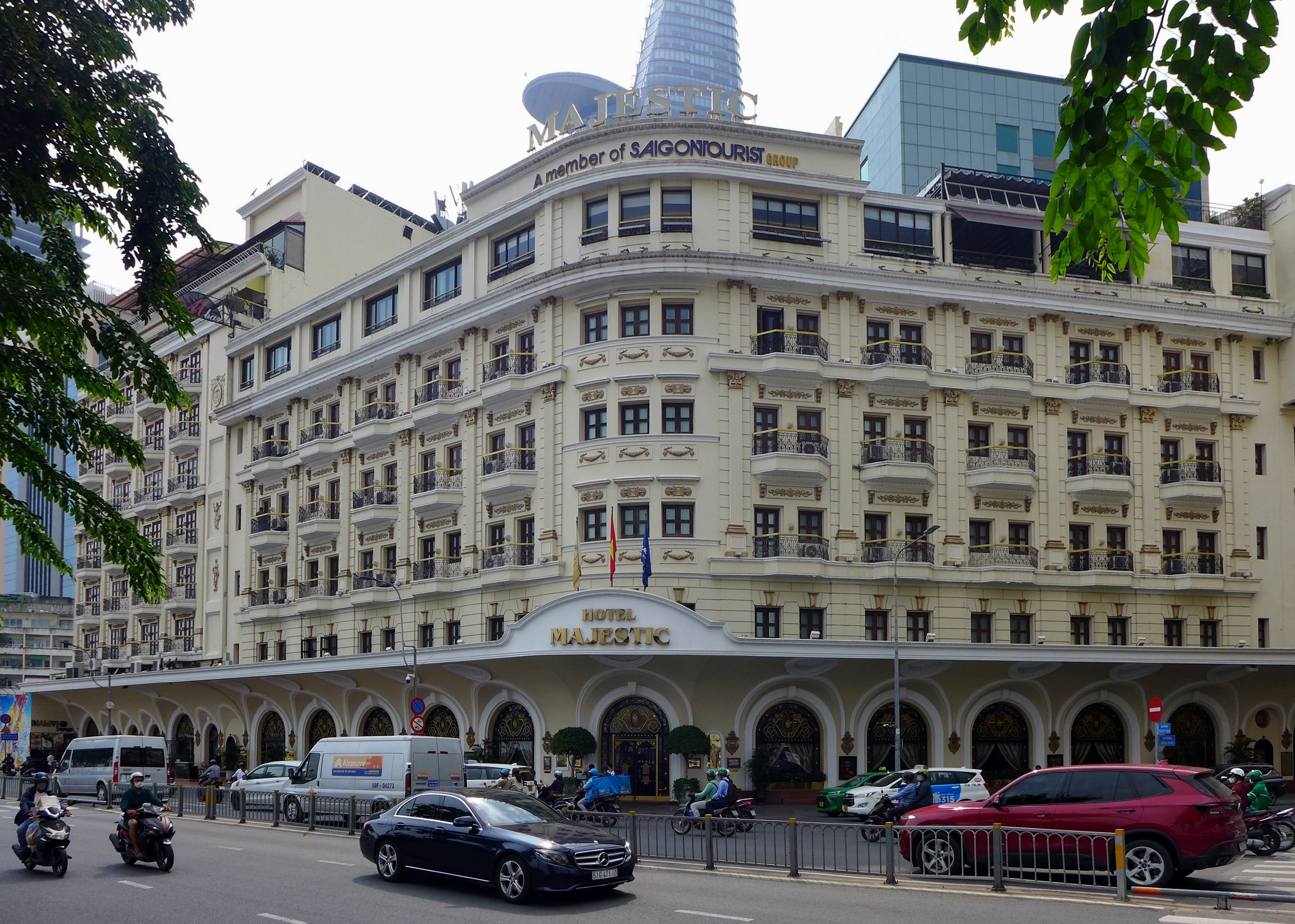
- The Hotel Majestic Saigon in 2023
- Former names: HM Hotel (Khách sạn Hoàn Mỹ; In Republic of Vietnam period)
- Alternative names: Cửu Long Hotel

General information
- Status: Complete; expansion is under construction
- Architectural style: Neo-Renaissance
- Classification: 5/5 stars
- Location: Corner of Đồng Khởi – Tôn Đức Thắng Boulevard, No.1 Đồng Khởi Street & 2-4-6 Nguyễn Huệ Boulevard (expansion), Saigon, Ho Chi Minh City, Vietnam
- Inaugurated: 1925; 101 years ago
- Renovated: 1994: Renovated the hotel into Renaissance style; 2003: A new 8-storey building was incorporated into the existing building on Tôn Đức Thắng Boulevard side of the hotel
- Owner: Saigontourist

Technical details
- Floor count: 8

Design and construction
- Architect: Ngô Viết Thụ
- Main contractor: Hui Bon Hoa

Other information
- Number of rooms: 175
- Number of restaurants: 6
- Number of bars: 3
- Public transit: L1 Opera House station; L2 Hàm Nghi station

Website
- Hotel Majestic Saigon

The Hotel Majestic or Majestic Hotel (Vietnamese: Khách sạn Majestic Sài Gòn, Khách sạn Cửu Long) is a historic luxury hotel in District 1, Ho Chi Minh City, Vietnam. Originally French colonial architecture on Bạch Đằng Quay, the bank of Saigon River, at the corner of Đồng Khởi – Tôn Đức Thắng, Ho Chi Minh City Center. It was first built and owned by the Chinese businessman Hui Bon Hoa and now is owned by Saigontourist Group.

== History ==
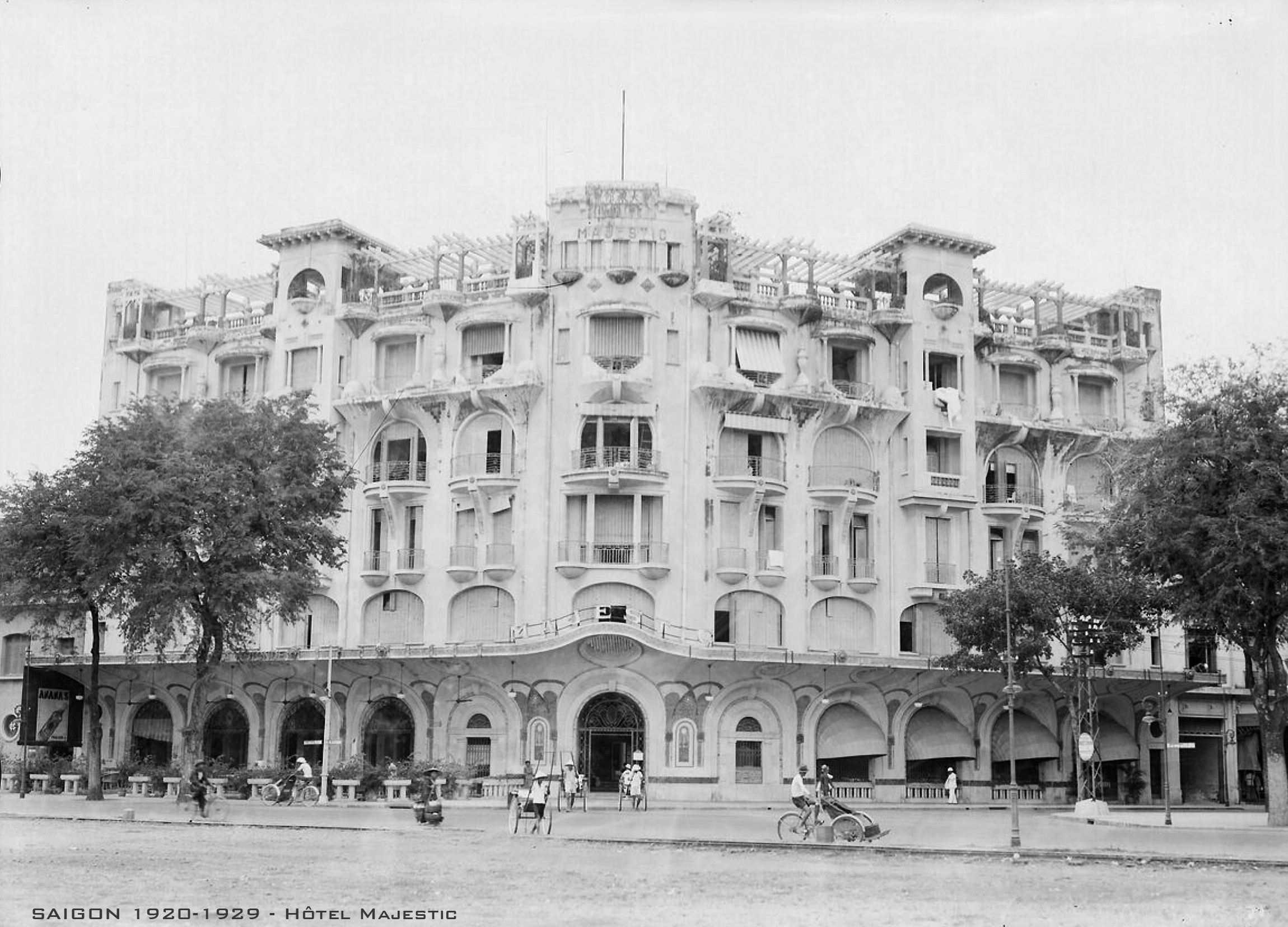
Hotel Majestic with Art Deco style in the 1920s

The Hotel Majestic at No. 1 Rue Catinat (now Đồng Khởi Street) was first built by the Vietnamese-Chinese businessman Hui Bon Hoa in 1925, was one of the richest business men in southern Vietnam at the time (some said it was done by his family actually as he was died in 1901 during his trip back to hometown in China). The original design was in a French Colonial with influence of Art Deco and classical French Riviera styles. It had three stories and 44 bedrooms.

In 1948, Mathieu Franchini, head of the Indochina Tourism & Exhibition Department then bought the ground and first floors of the hotel and rented 44 rooms in the building for the next 30 years.

In 1954, following the Geneva Accords, the International Commission for Supervision and Control in Vietnam established its offices at the Hotel Majestic. On July 20, 1955—the first anniversary of the French partition of Vietnam—a crowd of protesters marched to the Majestic to demonstrate against the Commission; the situation escalated into violence, involving arson and destruction. The Commission’s offices and the Hotel Majestic as a whole sustained heavy damage.

By 1965, Hotel Majestic was transferred to the Tourism Administration and General Department of Tourism Development (Nha Du lịch và Tổng cục Phát triển Du lịch) of the Republic of Vietnam, two more stories with an international style conference room and a restaurant were added based on the design of Vietnamese architect Ngô Viết Thụ and renamed the hotel as Khách sạn Hoàn Mỹ in Vietnamese or HM Hotel in English.

On April 26, 1975, the hotel was struck by Viet Cong artillery, sustaining significant damage. After 1975, the hotel name was changed to Cửu Long Hotel (Khách Sạn Cửu Long, named after the Cửu Long River), and it became a government guest house. It was recently renamed again to the original name, the six storey building is now a 5-star hotel overlooking the Bạch Đằng Quay and Saigon River. It is owned by the state-owned Saigon Tourist.

In 1994, the Majestic underwent renovations in the style of European-influenced Neo-Renaissance architecture, with the addition of new facilities such as a bar and international-standard meeting rooms. In 1997, the hotel was officially recognized by the Vietnam National Administration of Tourism as a 4-star establishment.

Hotel Majestic Saigon at night in 2012 with the new 8-story building next to it

In 2003, the Majestic underwent further upgrades, expanding to eight floors by renovate the building next to it on the side of Tôn Đức Thắng Boulevard.

By 2007, the hotel was recognized by the Vietnam National Administration of Tourism as a 5-star property. The Majestic holds the distinction of being the first 5-star hotel in Vietnam to be invested in, managed, and operated entirely by Vietnamese nationals. At that time, the General Manager was Mr. Tào Văn Nghệ.

Saigon Tourist announced a 1.9 trillion VND expansion project of the Majestic Hotel in July 2011. It plans to construct two towers of 24 and 27 storeys. The new complex will have a total 538 rooms, 353 of which will be hotel rooms.

== Literature ==
- William Warren, Jill Gocher (2007). Asia's legendary hotels: the romance of travel. Singapore: Periplus Editions. ISBN 978-0-7946-0174-4.
- Philippe CHAPLAIN : https://www.patrimoine.asso.fr/saigon-ho-chi-minh-ville-hotel-majestic/

== Gallery ==
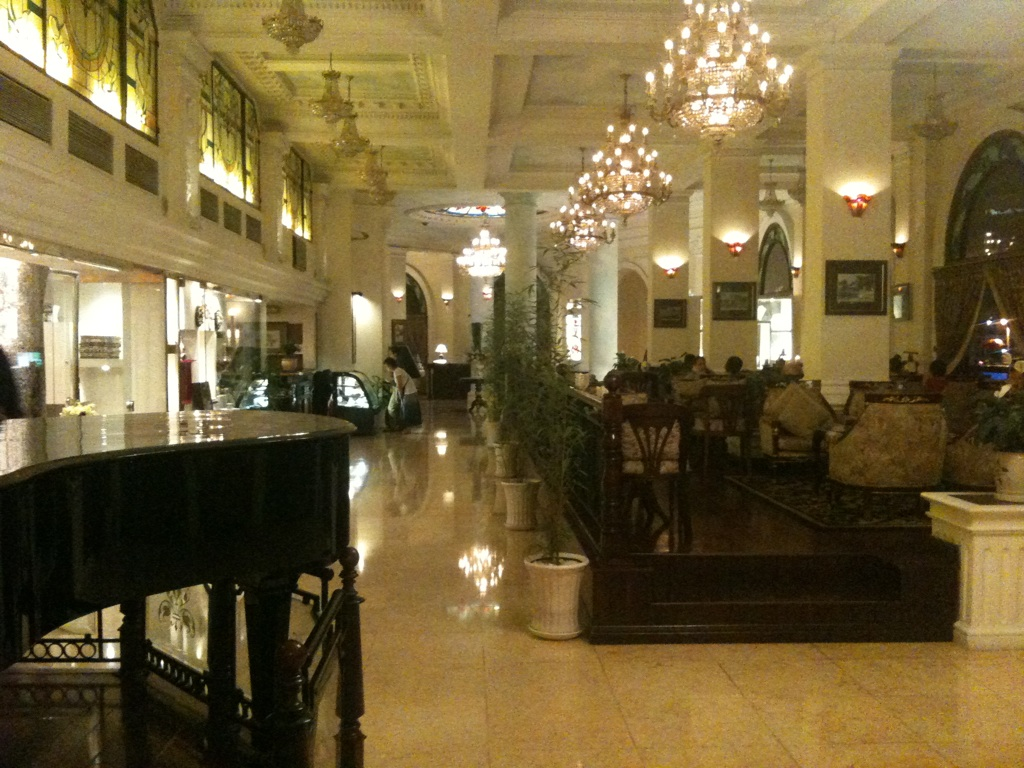
The hotel lobby

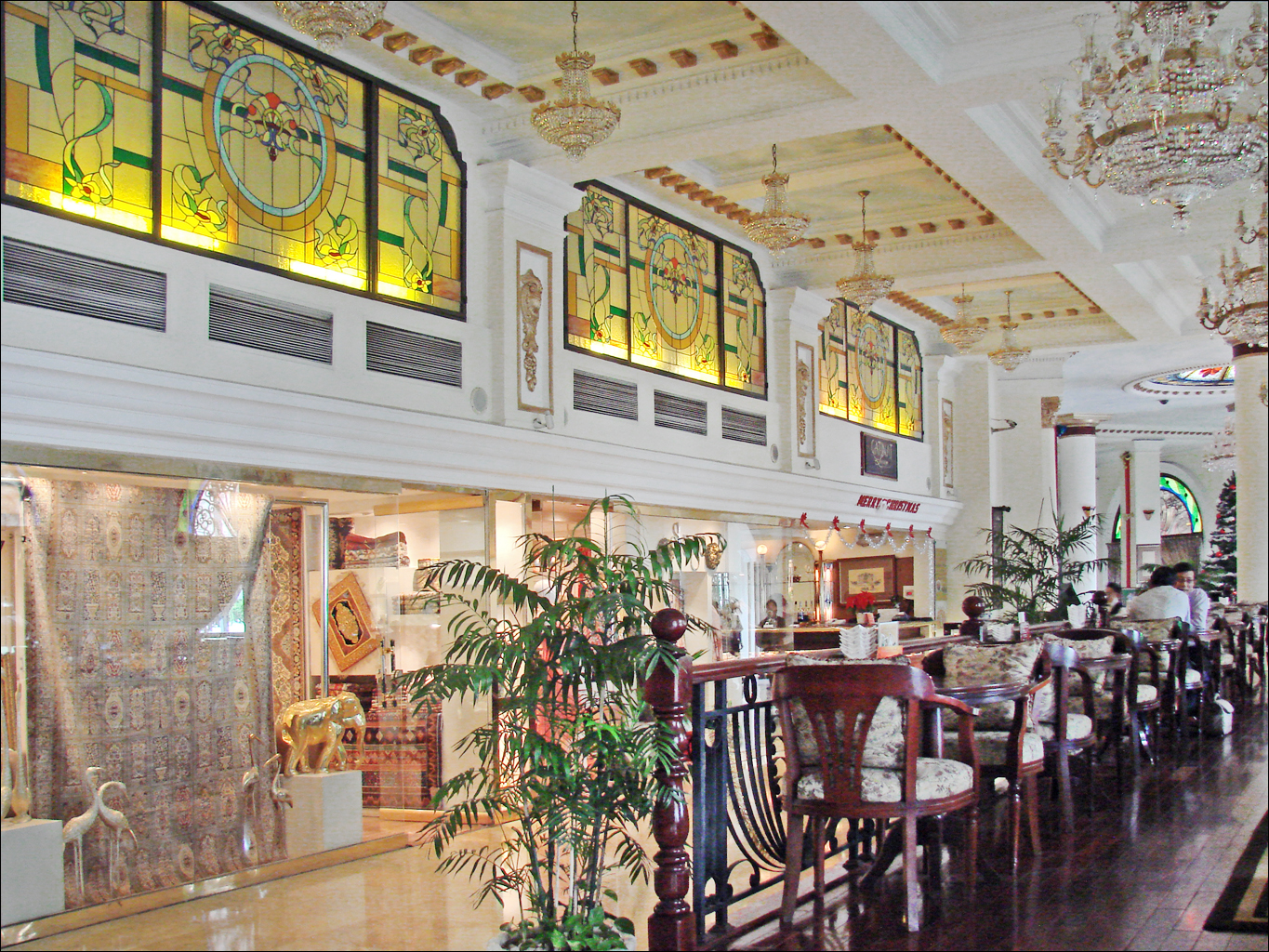
Restaurant in Majestic

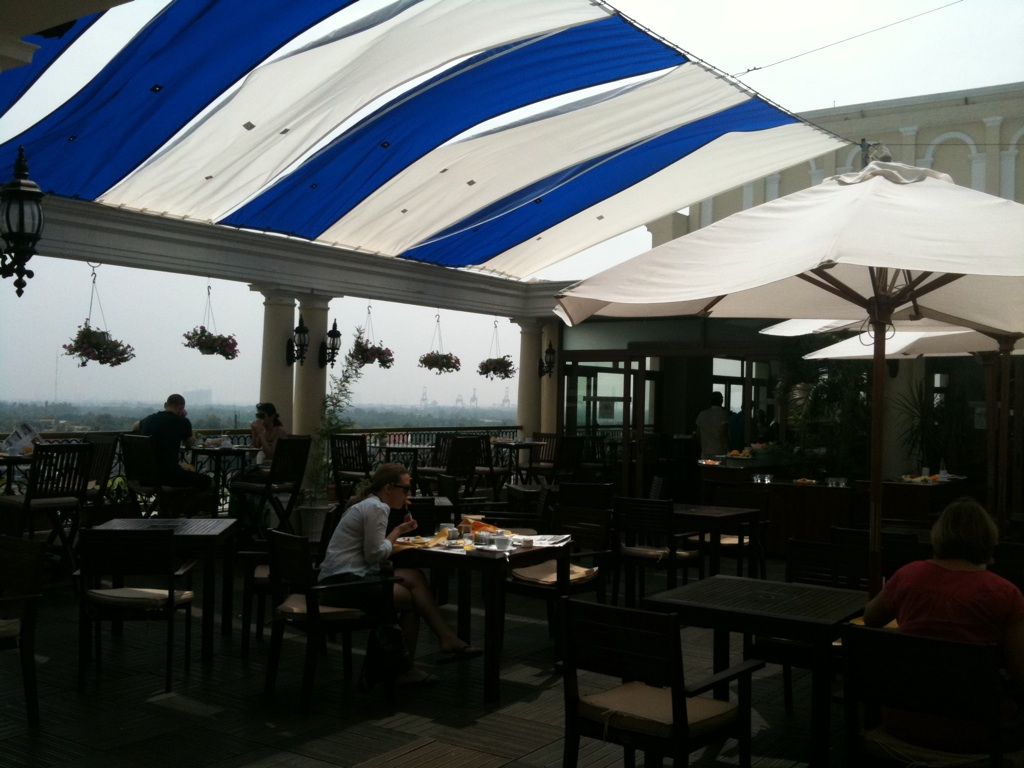
Hotel Majestic Saigon roof bar

Hotel Majestic plaques

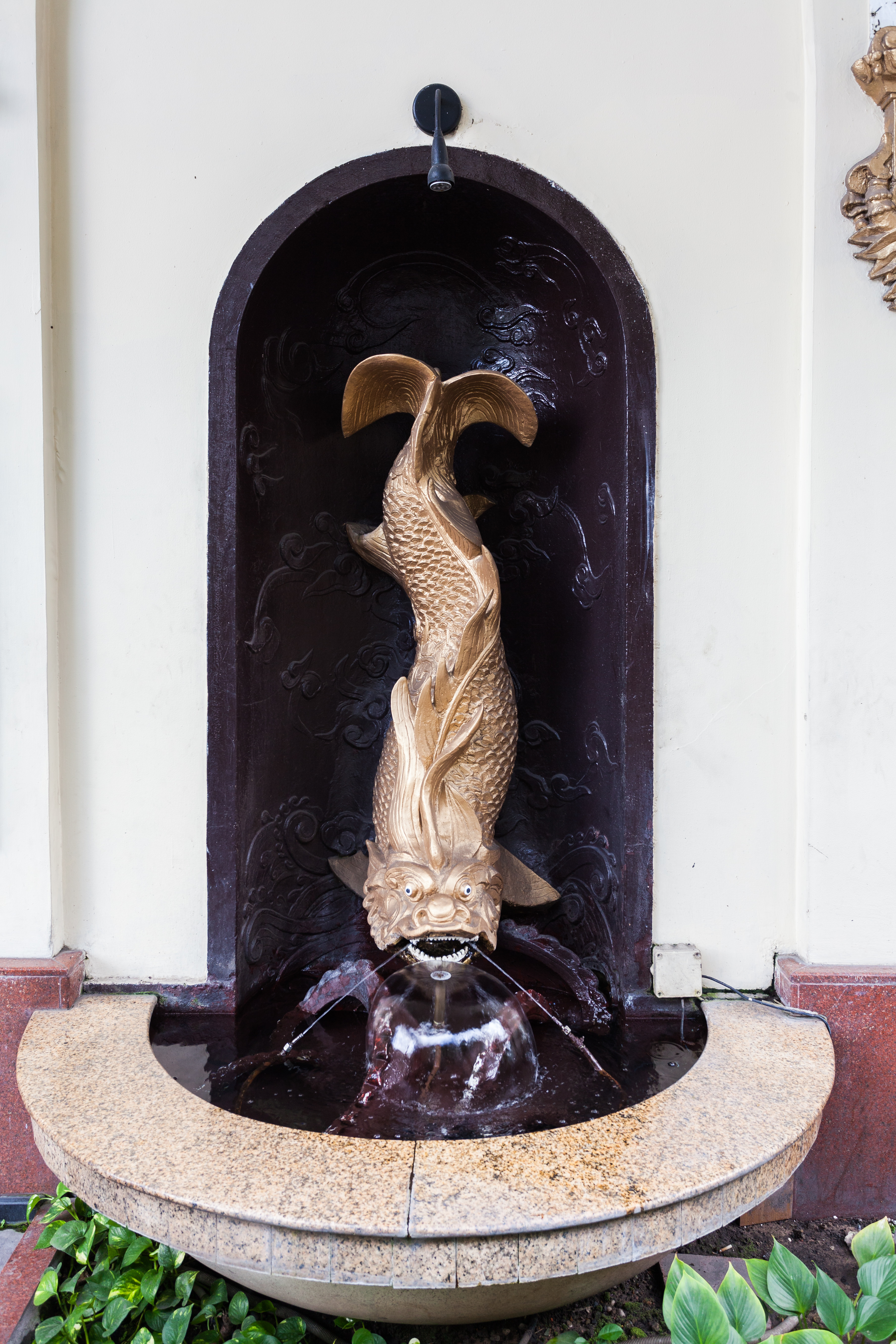
A catfish-shaped fountain

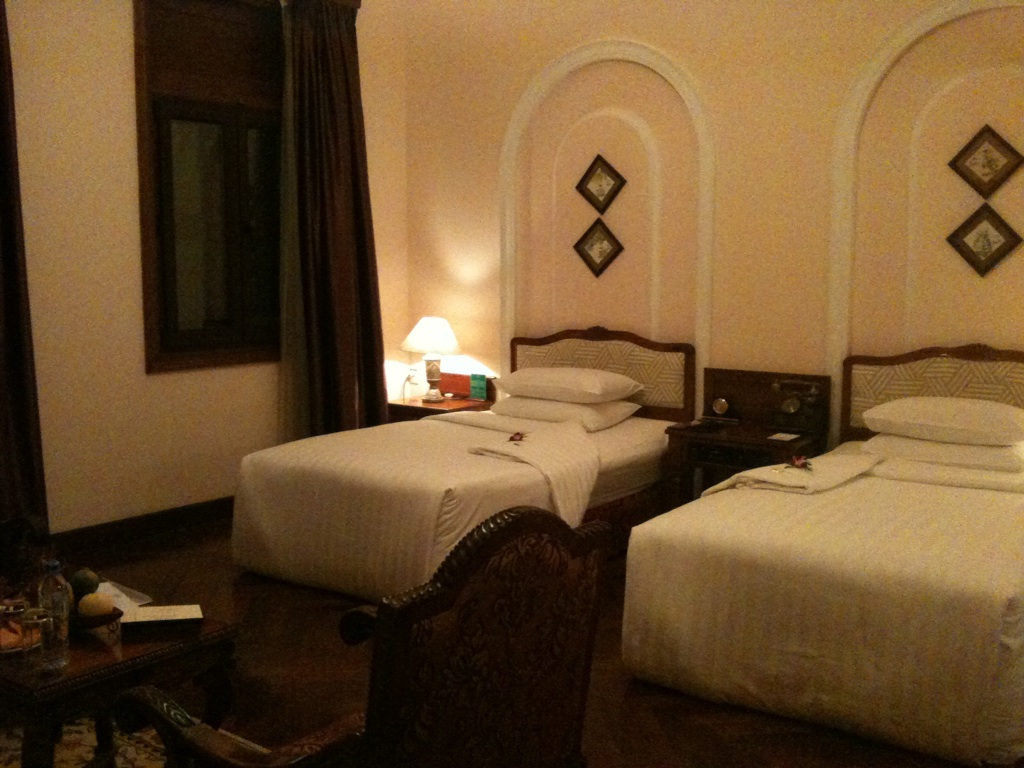
Hotel Majestic Saigon Riverside deluxe room

== See also ==
- Heritage hotels in Vietnam
- Sofitel Legend Metropole Hanoi (1901), the largest heritage hotel from the French Indochina period

Other historic hotels in Ho Chi Minh City:

- Hotel Continental Saigon (1880)
- Grand Hotel Saigon (1930)
- Caravelle Hotel (1959)
- Rex Hotel (1927)
