= Đồng Khởi Street =

Street in Ho Chi Minh City, Vietnam

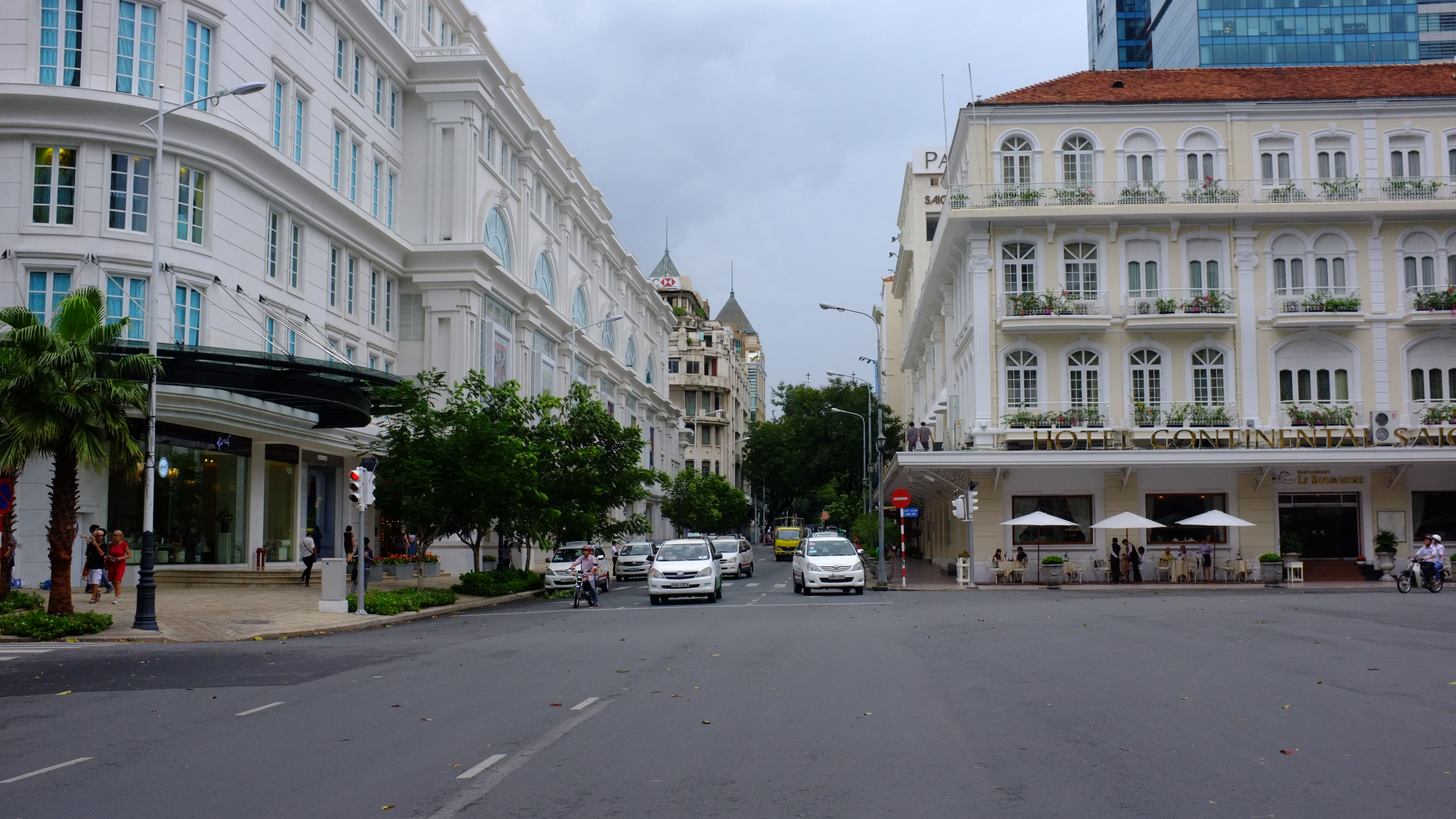
- Đồng Khởi Street in 2014 at Lam Sơn Square with Union Square Saigon on the left and Hotel Continental Saigon on the right
- Interactive map of Đồng Khởi Street
- Native name: Đường Đồng Khởi (Vietnamese)
- Former names: Rue Catinat (French Indochina); Tự Do Street (Republic of Vietnam)
- Namesake: Đồng Khởi Movement
- Owner: Ho Chi Minh City
- Length: 670 m (2,200 ft)
- Location: Saigon, Ho Chi Minh City
- Nearest metro station: 1 Opera House station
- Coordinates: 10°46′35″N 106°42′10″E
- Northwest end: Paris Commune Square, Nguyễn Du Street
- Major junctions: Lý Tự Trọng Street; Lê Thánh Tôn Street; Lam Sơn Square – Lê Lợi Boulevard; Mạc Thị Bưởi Street; Ngô Đức Kế Street
- Southeast end: Bạch Đằng Quay, Tôn Đức Thắng Boulevard

Other
- Known for: The most expensive shopping street in Ho Chi Minh City and Vietnam

Đồng Khởi Street (Vietnamese: Đường Đồng Khởi), formerly known as Rue Catinat then Tự Do Street, is a street in Saigon, Ho Chi Minh City, Vietnam.

The street stretches from Nguyễn Du Street at Paris Commune Square, to Tôn Đức Thắng Boulevard and Bạch Đằng Quay, Saigon River waterfront. It has been known as one of the busiest shopping street for centuries in the city.

== History ==
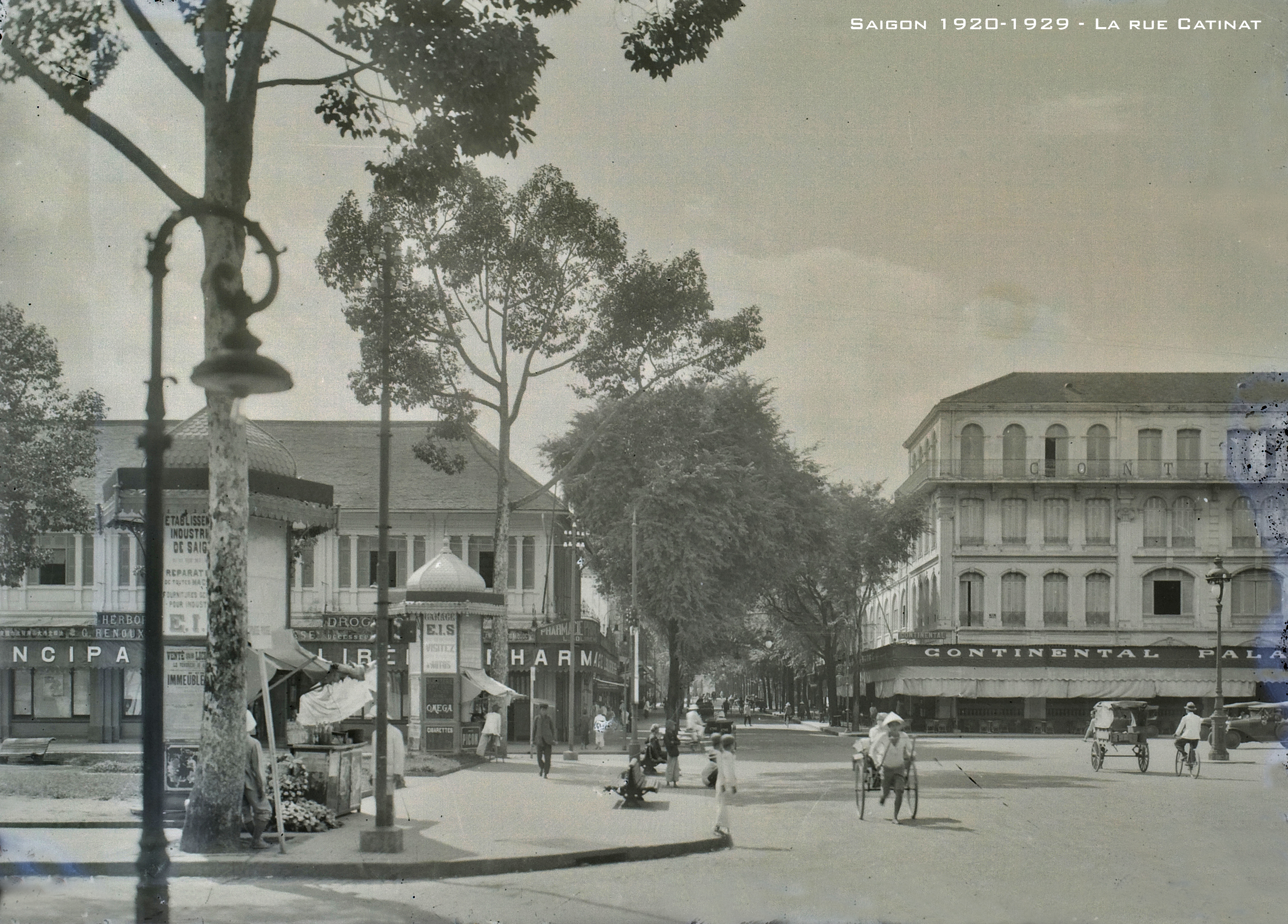
Rue Catinat at Place Francis Garnier in the 1920s

The street was initially called as Rue N⁰6 when the French colonial empire takeover Saigon, then named after the French cruiser Catinat that participated in the 1865, attacks by France when that country was intent on seizing control of Viet Nam. The ship itself honored Nicolas Catinat, a 17th- and 18th-century Marshal of France; but application of name to prominent street was intended to remind strollers of the first step toward control of a vanquished nation by a colonial power before its present incarnation as Đồng Khởi visitors to Saigon will remember Tự Do Street, as it was called by the Vietnamese after the French departed.

== Buildings ==
Đồng Khởi Street is the location of numerous famous buildings from colonial to modern period, list of some notable buildings:

Panorama with some notable buildings on Đồng Khởi Street featured

| Address | Name | Image | Cross-street | Notes and notable tenants |
|---|---|---|---|---|
| No.1 Đồng Khởi | Hotel Majestic Saigon | Hotel Majestic, Saigon, 2023 (01) | 2–4–6 Nguyễn Huệ Boulevard | Built in 1925, with a central courtyard and a roof bar name M Bar. Vertu Majestic Saigon store is located here. |
| 2–4–6 Đồng Khởi | Seaprodex Building | Ton duc thang, Dong khoi street, ben thanh, district 1, hcmcity - panoramio | Tôn Đức Thắng Boulevard | Previously the place of Café de la Rotonde. Seaprodex headquarter, Casa Đồng Khởi Café & Restaurant (Nova Group), Dragon Palace Restaurant, RuNam Đồng Khởi are here. |
| No.8 Đồng Khởi | Hotel Grand Saigon | Hotel Grand Saigon P1310935 | 15 Hồ Huấn Nghiệp Street – 16 Ngô Đức Kế (formerly the Palace Hotel) | Also known as Grand Hotel, Khách sạn Đồng Khởi; formerly known as Saigon Palace. Longines Flagship Boutique & Service Centre located here |
| 57–69F Đồng Khởi | Saigon Times Square | Saigon Times Square from Bitexco | 22–36 Nguyễn Huệ Blvd | The Reverie Saigon Hotel, The Hour Glass, Deloitte |
| 58–60–62–64 Đồng Khởi | Satra Building | | 51–53–55–57–59 Mạc Thị Bưởi | Lacoste. Also known as Satra Đồng Khởi |
| 66-68-70 Đồng Khởi | Hương Sen Hotel | Huong Sen Hotel (36327771544) | 62 Mạc Thị Bưởi | Originally the building of L'Impartial Press in 1920 then changed into Astor Hotel in 1970 and renamed as Hương Sen Hotel after 1975 |
| 80 Đồng Khởi | | | | Trung Nguyên Legend Café |
| 88 Đồng Khởi | Sheraton Saigon Grand Opera Hotel | Sheraton und Caravelle Hotel | 80 Đông Du | Suntory PepsiCo Vietnam [vi], PepsiCo, Gucci, Bang & Olufsen, Boss, Rolex, |
| 93–95–97 Đồng Khởi | | | | Việt Nam House Restaurant |
| 109–111–113 Đồng Khởi | Catina Saigon Hotel | | | |
| 115–117–119–121–123 Đồng Khởi | Bông Sen Hotel Saigon | Bông Sen Hotel | | |
| 130 Đồng Khởi | Caravelle Hotel | Duong Dong khoi, Ben Nghe, quan 1, tphcmvn - panoramio | 19–21–23 Lam Sơn Square | Air France Office was here, Vertu Caravelle Store is located here. It was named after the Sud Aviation Caravelle |
| No. 7 Lam Sơn Square | Saigon Opera House | Le théâtre municipal (Hô Chi Minh Ville) (6762444557) | Lê Lợi – Hai Bà Trưng | |
| 132–134 Đồng Khởi | Hotel Continental Saigon | | Lam Sơn Square | Blancpain, Breguet, Saint Laurent, Tam Sơn Living |
| 135–149 Đồng Khởi | | | 2 Nguyễn Thiệp | Eximbank Authorized Bureau No.59B, Jacob & Co HCMC Boutique |
| 151–159 Đồng Khởi | 151 Đồng Khởi Apartment | Pho Dong khoi- phuong ben nghe , Saigon vn - panoramio | | Art Arcade – An Fine Art Gallery, OKKIO Caffe – Tự Do |
| 146–148–150 Đồng Khởi | Oriental Diamond Complex Hotel | Parkson Le thanh ton ,Dong Khoi q1,tp Hcm - panoramio | | Previously was Asian Hotel |
| 136–144 & 152–154 Đồng Khởi | Saigontourist Plaza | Parkson Le thanh ton ,Dong Khoi q1,tp Hcm - panoramio | 35Bis–45 Lê Thánh Tôn | Uniqlo, Muji, ABC-Mart. Formerly known as Parkson Saigontourist Plaza |
| 161 Đồng Khởi | Opera View Building by Artex Saigon | | 15 Lê Lợi Blvd | Louis Vuitton, Franck Muller |
| 171 Đồng Khởi | Union Square Saigon | Saigon Vincom Center A, now is Saigon Union Square | 53 Lê Thánh Tôn Street – 6A Lê Lợi Boulevard – 116 Nguyễn Huệ Boulevard | Starbucks, Bulgari, Dior, Fendi, Hermès, Louis Vuitton, Tiffany & Co., Mandarin Oriental Hotel, Saigon. Originally was Café de la Musique and the Grand Hôtel des Nations then Les Magasins Liên-Seng, Passage Eden |
| 156 Đồng Khởi | Chi Lăng Park & Vincom Center Đồng Khởi | | 72 Lê Thánh Tôn & 45–45A Lý Tự Trọng | Eximbank, Maybank Kim Eng, H&M, Uniqlo, CJ CGV, Haidilao, MLB, Sony |
| 158 Đồng Khởi | 26 Lý Tự Trọng Apartment | | 26 Lý Tự Trọng | Katinat Saigon Kafe, The New Playground |
| 164 Đồng Khởi | Ho Chi Minh City Department of Culture and Sports | Duong Nguen du va dong khoi-Bến Nghé, Quận 1, TPHCM, Việt Nam - panoramio | | Original place of Catinat Police Station (Bot Catinat) |
| 213 Đồng Khởi | Ho Chi Minh City Hall | Nga tu Dong KHoi- Ly tu trong, q1 tphcmvn - panoramio | 86 Lê Thánh Tôn & 59–61 Lý Tự Trọng | The building on Đồng Khởi Street was the Cochinchina Governor's Private Secretary's Office and was demolished in 2014 to extend the current City Hall |
| 227 Đồng Khởi | Ho Chi Minh City Environmental Protection Department | Ngu tu Ly tu trong va Dong Khoi , q1,tpHcm - panoramio | 28 Lý Tự Trọng | |
| 235 Đồng Khởi | The Metropolitan Tower | Dong Khoi Street Ho Chi Minh | | HSBC Vietnam Headquarters, QBE Insurance, Vietcombank, Mead Johnson, Tetra Pak, Nike, Inc., Consulate General of Canada, Consulate General of New Zealand |

Other places:

- Palais Cafe, a bar, also renovated.

== Gallery ==
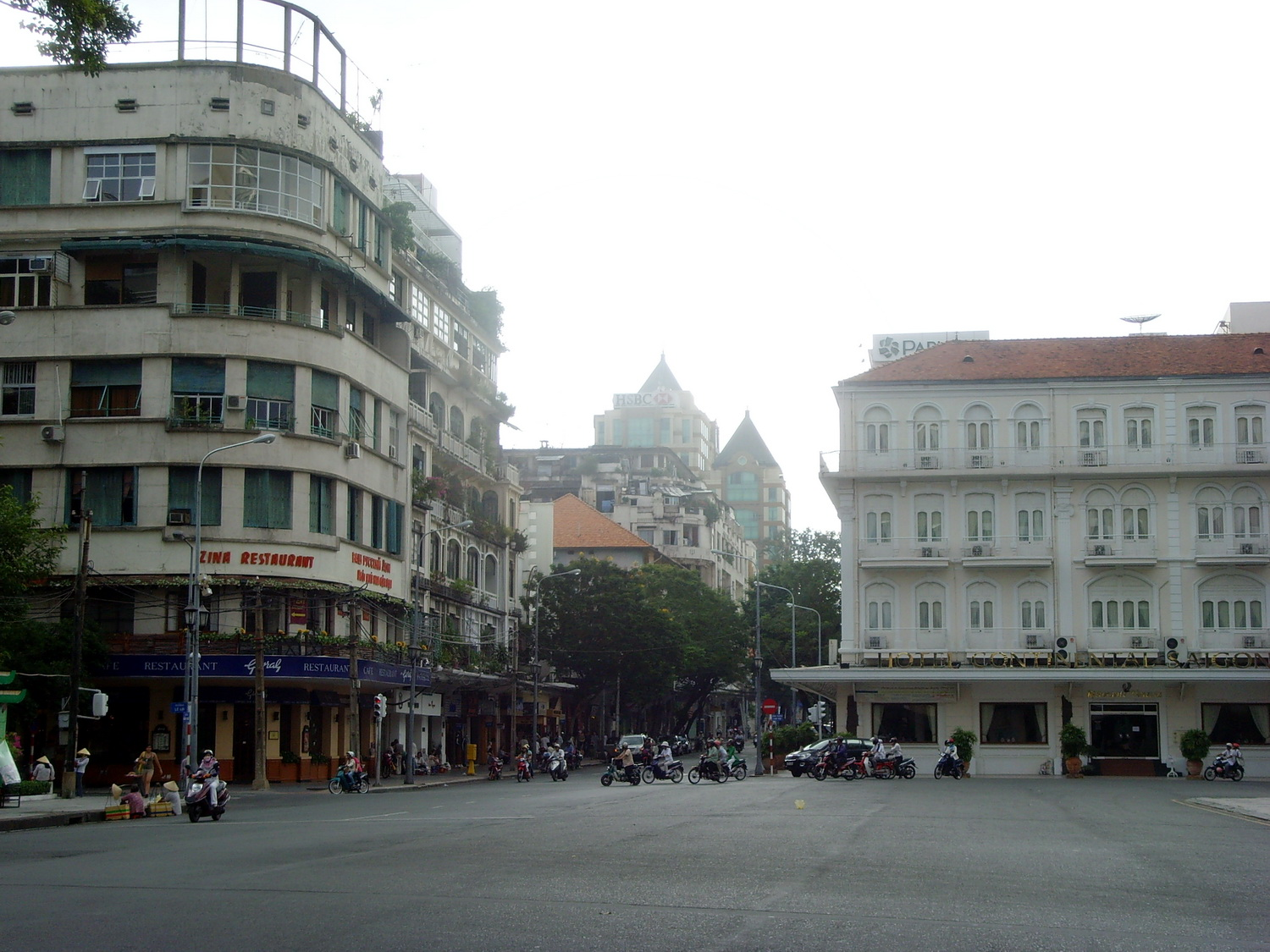
Lam Sơn Square, Intersection of Lê Lợi and Đồng Khởi in 2008

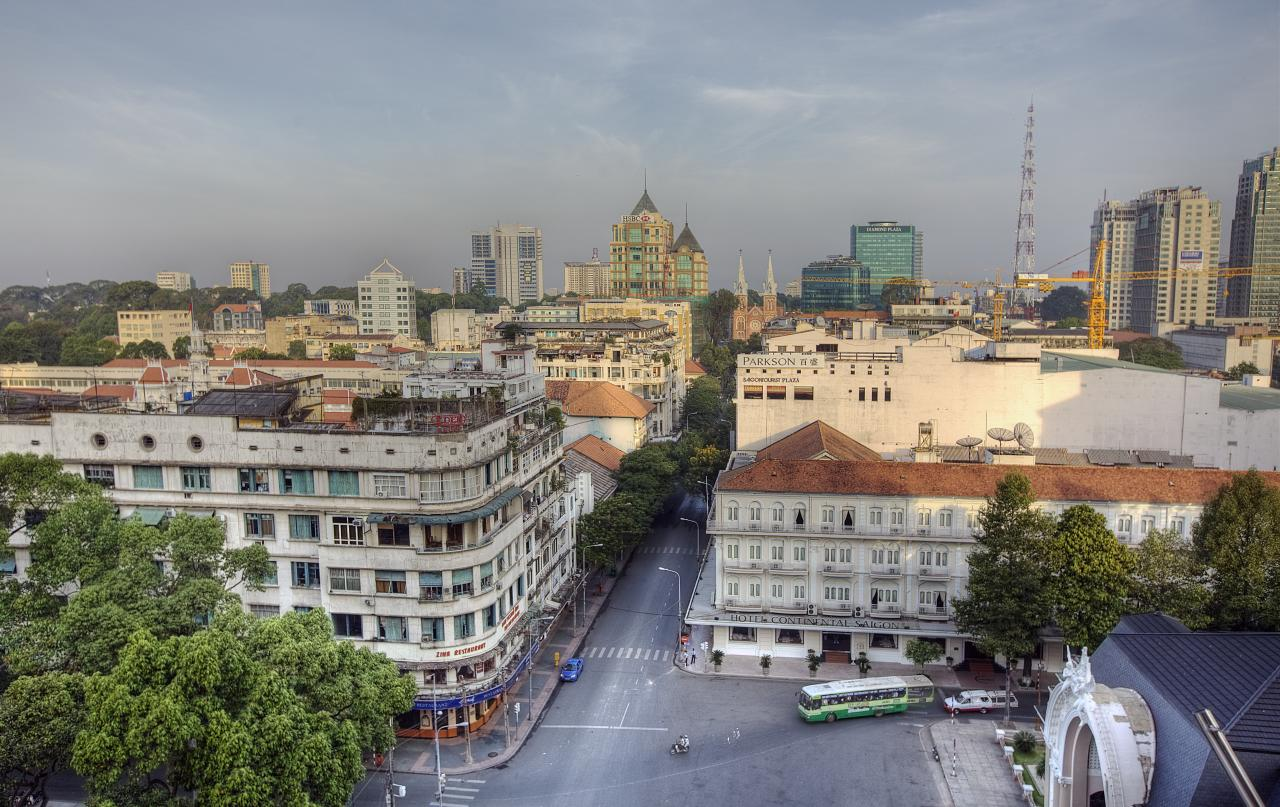
Đồng Khởi Street seen from Sheraton Saigon Grand Opera Hotel in 2009

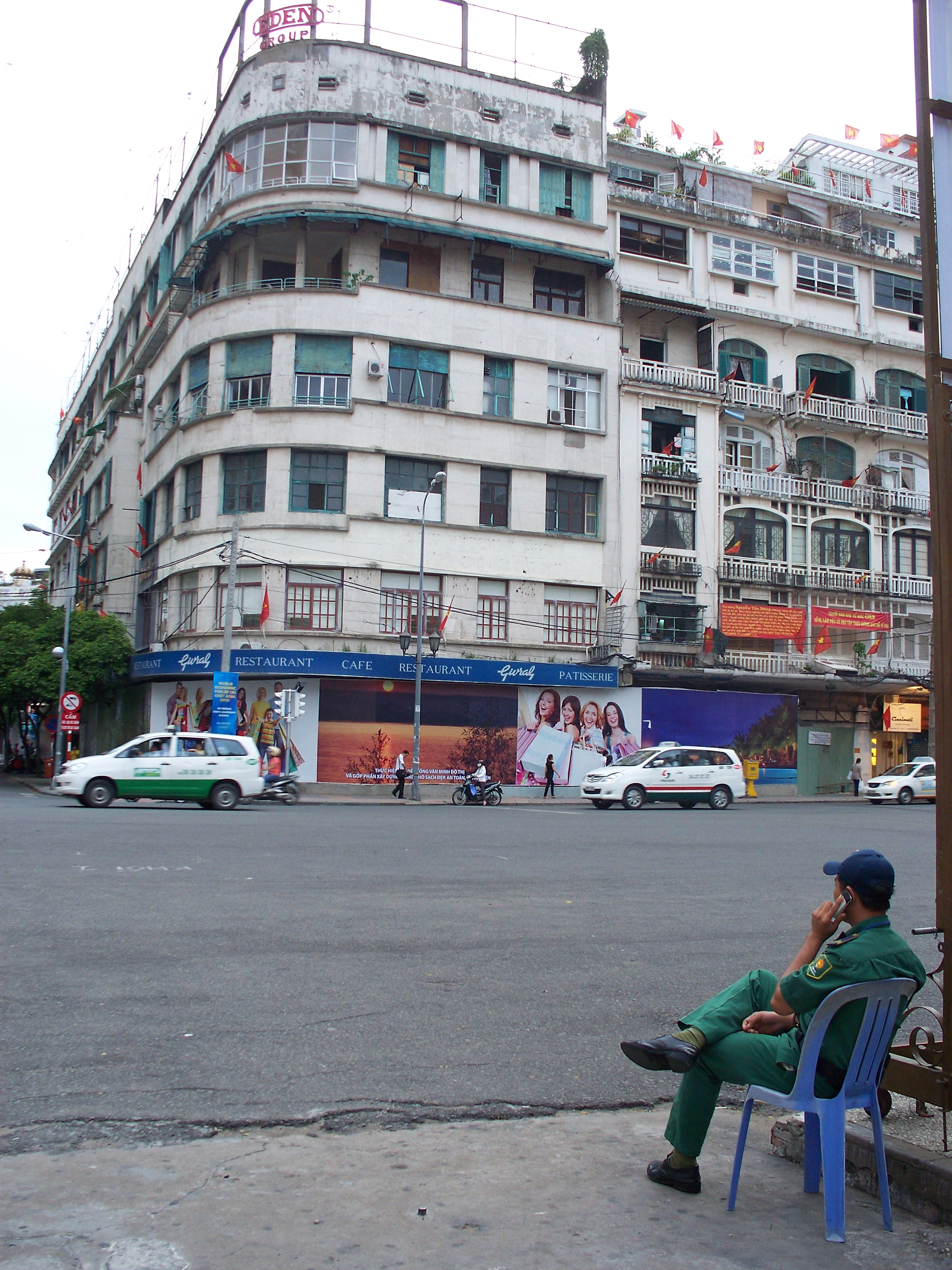
Eden Center, few days before the demolition for Union Square Saigon

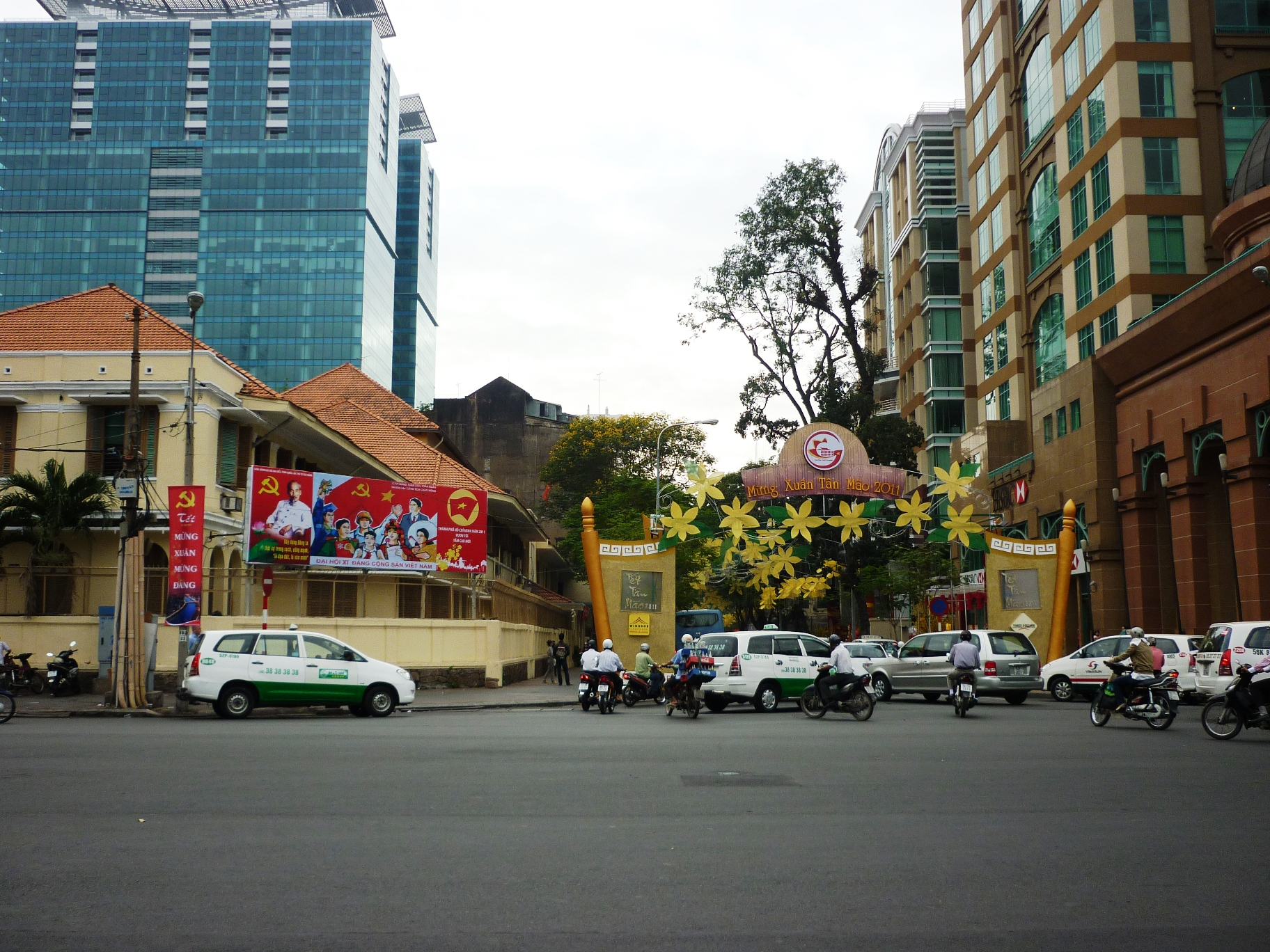
Đồng Khởi Street in Tết 2011

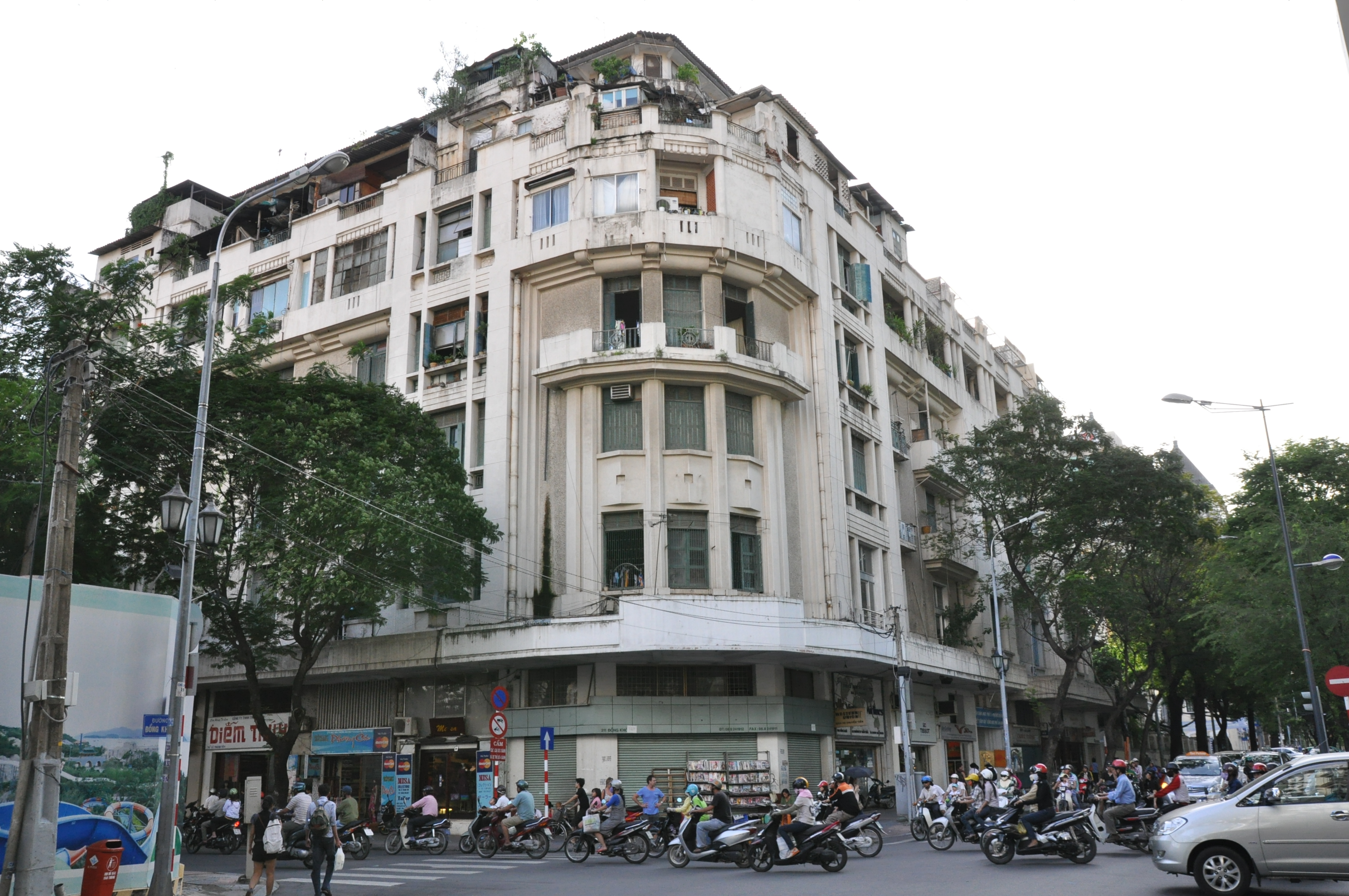
213 Đồng Khởi Building was the Cochinchina Governor's Private Secretary's Office, now is demolished and redeveloped as the extension of the Ho Chi Minh City Hall

== See also ==
- Nguyễn Huệ Boulevard
- Lê Lợi Boulevard
