= Ba Son Shipyard =

Saigon Naval Shipyard
- Ba Son Shipyard
- Bến Nghé
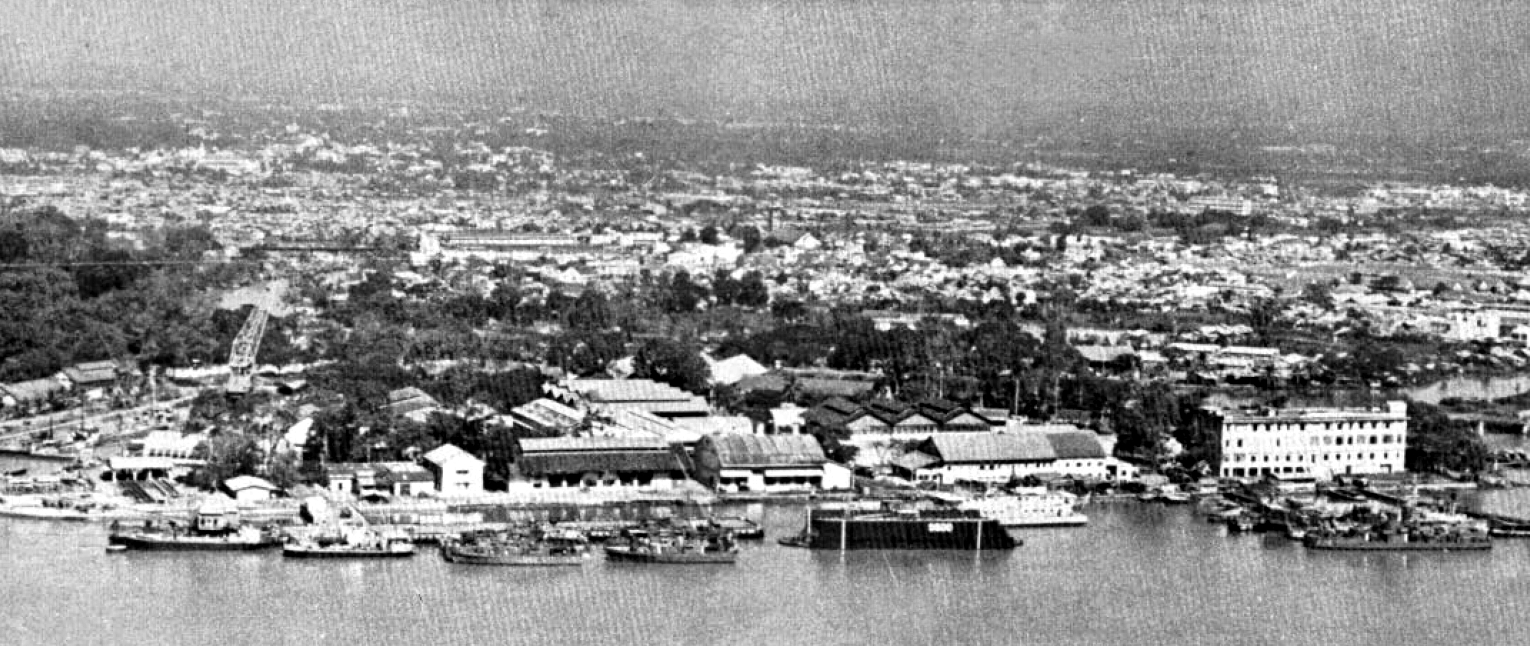
- The shipyard in 1968

Site information
- Type: Navy
- Controlled by: Vietnam People's Navy; Republic of Vietnam Navy; French Navy

Location
- Coordinates: 10.783°N 106.708°E

Site history
- Built: 1788
- Built by: Nguyễn Phúc Ánh
- In use: 1788–2015
- Battles/wars: Vietnam War

Ba Son Corporation
- Native name: Tổng công ty Ba Son
- Industry: Shipbuilding; Hospitality industry
- Predecessor: Saigon Naval Shipyard (Ba Son Workshop)
- Founded: 1863
- Headquarters: No. 2 Tôn Đức Thắng Boulevard, Ba Son Quarter, Saigon ward, Ho Chi Minh City, Vietnam
- Number of locations: 1 factory in Phú Mỹ ward (formerly Phú Mỹ, Bà Rịa–Vũng Tàu province)
- Owner: Vietnam Ministry of National Defence
- Website: Ba Son Shipyard

Saigon Naval Shipyard is a former French Navy, Republic of Vietnam Navy (RVNN) and Vietnam People's Navy (VPN) base in Saigon Vietnam.

The 57-acre (230,000 m^{2}) base, located on the southwest bank of the Saigon River about 30 miles (48 km) from the South China Sea, represented the largest single industrial complex in South East Asia. Officially known as the Ba Son Corporation (Tổng công ty Ba Son), the modern incarnation of the shipyard is now based in the Phú Mỹ II Industrial Park, Phú Mỹ, Bà Rịa–Vũng Tàu province, being one of the major shipyards in Vietnam.

== History ==
The shipyard was originally created around 1788 by Lord (Chúa) Nguyễn Phúc Ánh as the Chu Sư Naval workshop (Vietnamese: Xưởng Chu Sư). With help from French engineers Lord Nguyen built a fleet of ships that helped him defeat the Tây Sơn dynasty and establish him as Emperor Gia Long. The naval workshop was progressively expanded and after the French conquered Cochinchina in 1862 they expanded the area as the Port de la Marine (Naval Port) under the control of the French Navy.

The French Navy expanded the base facilities making it the Navy headquarters and home to the Naval Artillery and barracks. In 1864, the Navy expanded the Chu Su Naval workshop into the Naval Arsenal and Shipyard which by 1888 had modern facilities including a 168m drydock. In 1902, the base became the headquarters of the Naval Forces of the Oriental Seas under the command of a Vice Admiral who controlled 38 ships and over 3800 officers and sailors. By 1918, the shipyard was capable of building vessels of up to 3500 Deadweight tonnage (DWT).

With the departure of the French the base passed to the control of the RVNN. In 1955 the shipyard was renamed the Ba Son Shipyard and it was capable of building vessels up to 10,000 DWT and repairing vessels up to 35,000 DWT.

Starting in 1965, the shipyard built 90 Yabuta junks for the Junk Force to replace their wooden junks. Mr. Yabuta, a Japanese engineer at the shipyard in 1961, originally designed the 57 feet (17 m) junk. Armed with a .30-caliber machine gun, it featured a 110-horsepower diesel engine capable of generating ten knots of speed and was built entirely out of fiberglass, which obviated the need to treat the hulls for wood-boring Teredo worms. Wooden junks, by contrast, needed to have their hulls scraped, blow-torched and resealed every three months. The U.S. Military Assistance Program provided funds for building materials and engines, and the Vietnamese paid the wages of the shipyard laborers who built the junks. After the first Yabutas were completed, output slowed significantly. In 1966 the shipyard built only nine junks and in 1967, just 15. Production went from three junks a week in 1965 to one every five weeks in 1967 as private construction firms lured shipyard workers away with salaries, on average, three times higher than what the government had paid them.

At 03:00 on 31 January 1968 at the start of the Tet Offensive, twelve Viet Cong (VC) sappers approached the base in two civilian cars, killing two guards at a barricade at Me Linh Square and then advanced towards the base gate. The sound of gunfire alerted base sentries who secured the gate and sounded the alarm. A .30-caliber machine gun on the second floor of the headquarters disabled both cars and killed or wounded several sappers while the Navy security force organized a counterattack. Simultaneously a U.S. Navy advisor contacted the U.S. military police who soon attacked the VC from adjoining streets, the resulting crossfire ended the attack, killing eight sappers with two captured.

=== Post-Vietnam War ===
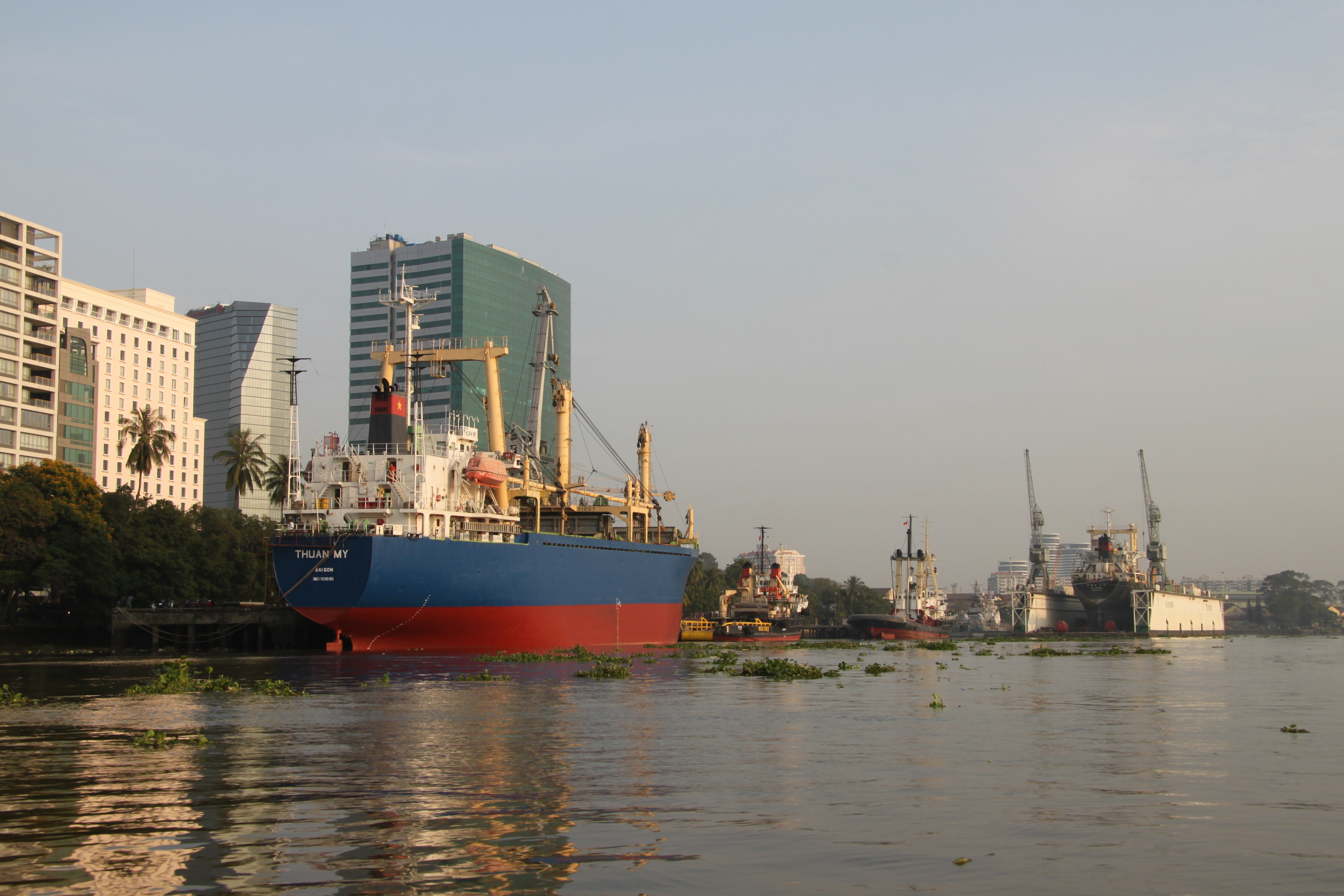
The shipyard in 2014, viewed from Saigon River

With the Fall of Saigon the base was taken over by the VPN which continues to use the barracks at 1A Ton Duc Thang (10.776°N 106.706°E) to the present day. In 2015, the Ba Son Shipyard was closed and sold to a private developer who later demolished all the facilities to make way for apartment development.

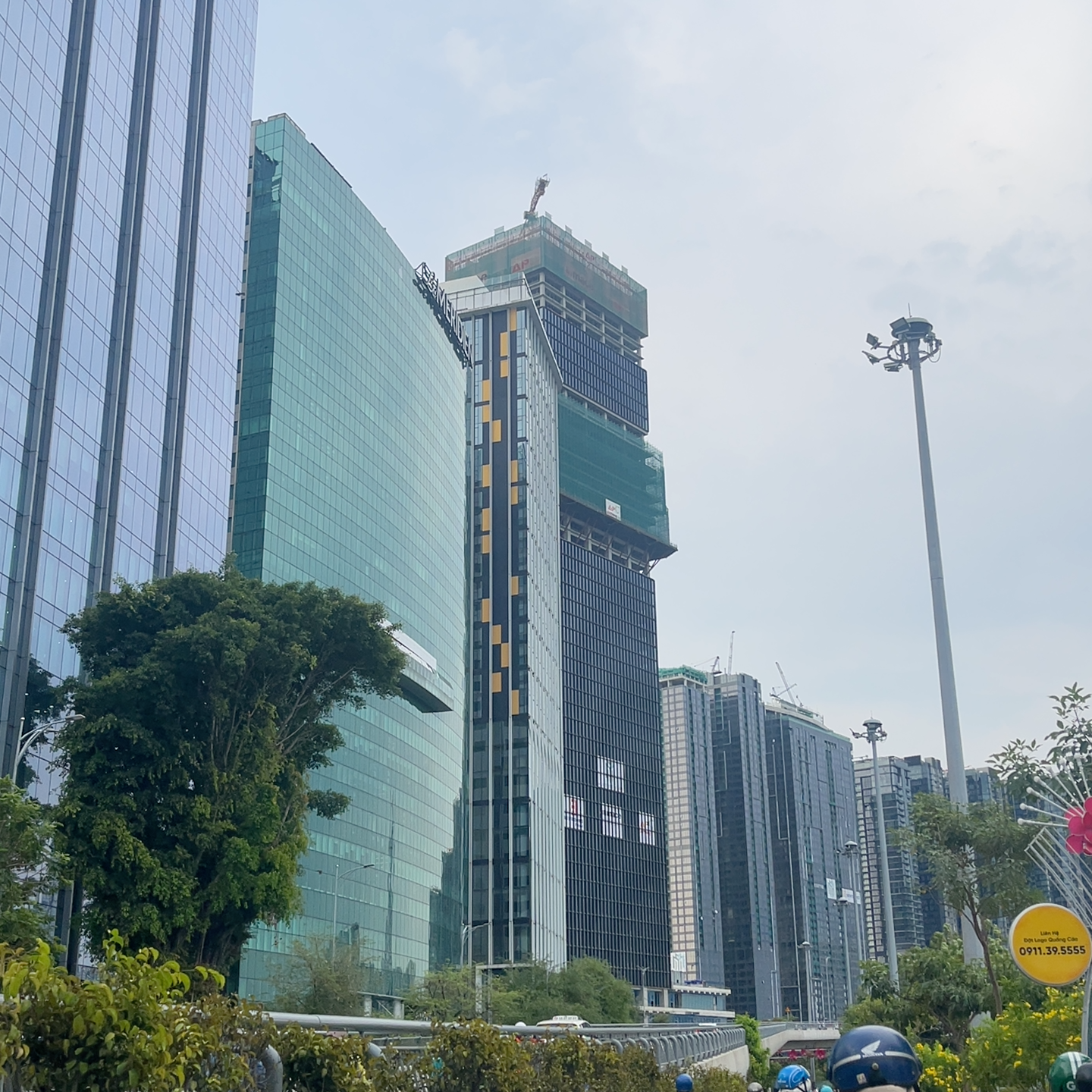
The area of former Ba Son Shipyard nowadays, seen from Bạch Đằng Quay

The development is a commercial and apartment complex named Saigon – Ba Son, it is also known as the Ba Son Quarter administratively, including the Ba Son station of Ho Chi Minh City Metro Line 1, Vinhomes Golden River apartments, Grand Marina Saigon – JW Marriott and Marriott Branded Residences with two commercial buildings are the 55-storey Saigon Marina IFC and the upcoming UOB Plaza Vietnam, the new headquarters location in Vietnam of the United Overseas Bank. Part of this quarter including the commercial buildings in here will be part of the planned international finance center of Ho Chi Minh City.
