= Bạch Đằng Quay =

Saigon River waterfront in Ho Chi Minh City

- Bến Bạch Đằng
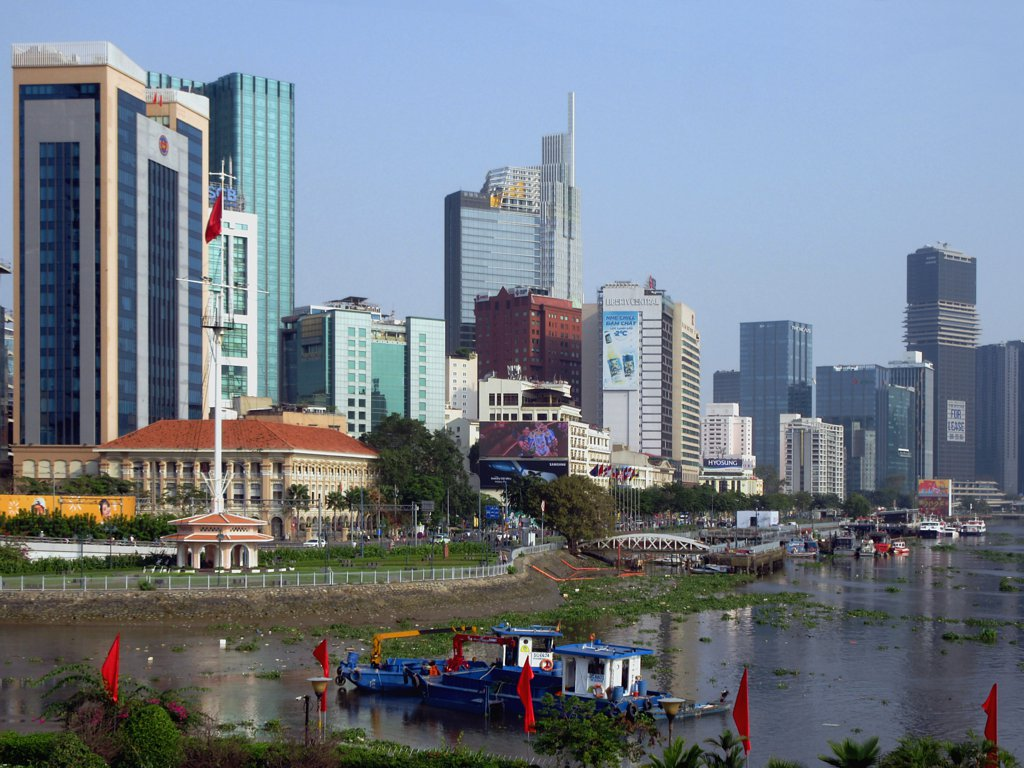
- Bạch Đằng Quay viewed from Dragon Wharf as of 2025
- Interactive map of Bạch Đằng Quay
- Type: Urban park
- Location: Saigon, Ho Chi Minh City
- Coordinates: 10°46′31″N 106°42′25″E
- Area: 23,400 square metres (252,000 sq ft)
- Created: Early 19th century
- Public transit: Buses: Line 1, 3, 19, 45, 53, 56, 61-6, 88; Waterbus: Line 1, 2; Express boat: Ho Chi Minh City – Vũng Tàu; Bạch Đằng Quay – Bình Dương – Củ Chi; MRT: 1 Ba Son station

Bạch Đằng Quay (Vietnamese: Bến Bạch Đằng) is a wharf and park with an address No.2 Tôn Đức Thắng Boulevard, Bến Nghé (now is Saigon ward), Ho Chi Minh City, Vietnam. It stretches along about 1.3 kilometres (0.81 mi) of the Saigon River from the Thủ Ngữ flagpole (Three-way junction of Bến Nghé Channel and Saigon River) to the site of the former Ba Son Shipyard (now the Saigon – Ba Son complex) and covers an area of 23,400 square metres (252,000 sq ft).

== History ==
According to scholar Pétrus Ký, the waterfront area at the end of rue Catinat was once called Bến Ngự (translating to "royal wharf"), the royal landing stage. He also revealed that it was known in Khmer as Compong-luong, which suggests that its history may date back to the 17th century, when Saigon was still the Cambodian settlement of Prey Nokor.

During the early years of French colonial rule, the Mercantile port of Saigon continued to use wharves immediately north of the arroyo Chinois extending as far as the Rond-point (modern-day Mê Linh Square). However, in 1881, these wharves were transformed into the River port and were entrusted to the management of the Compagnies des Messageries fluviales (the River Shipping Company), the replacement mercantile port was constructed in Khánh Hội (modern-day District 4). This quayside area had its name changed quite often throughout the French colonial period. Initially quai de Donnai, the name was successively changed to quai Napoléon (1865), quai du Commerce (1870), quai Francis Garnier (1896) and finally quai le Myre de Vilers (1920). On 11 August 1890, the Lieutenant-Governor of Cochinchina authorized the installation of a tramway track along the quay.

Additionally, the quayside north of the River port and the Rond-point was used as the Naval port (Port de la marine) and controlled by the French Navy (Marine nationale française). This quay, initially called quai Primauguet and then changed to quai d'Argonne in 1920, housed the Naval Commander’s headquarters (Hôtel du Commandant de la Marine), the Naval Artillery (Artillerie de Marine) and the Naval Barracks (Caserne de la Marine, later Caserne Francis-Garnier). The Saigon Naval Shipyard is located immediately north of the quay and stretches as far as the mouth of the arroyo de l’Avalanche.

After the departure of the French, the River port was taken over by the Saigon Port Authority (Nha Thương cảng Sài Gòn). Meanwhile, the Naval port was managed first by the Republic of Vietnam and later by the Socialist Republic of Vietnam Ministries of Defence. Both quai le Myre de Vilers and quai d'Argonne were given a single Vietnamese name, Bến Bạch Đằng, by the South Vietnamese government in 1955.

The colonial naval barracks and artillery buildings continued to be used by naval personnel until the 1990s, but since that time the old artillery compound has been demolished to redevelop new hotels and office blocks. The former Caserne Francis Garnier barracks, now located at 1A Tôn Đức Thắng, is the only surviving operational naval installation in this area.

In 2015, the government of Ho Chi Minh City decided to close the River port at Bach Dang Quay to renovate the wharf and park. In the same year, the Naval port was also closed following the relocation of the Ba Son Shipyard to Bà Rịa–Vũng Tàu province. The renovation of the area was eventually carried out in 2021 and completed in 2022, which gave the park its current appearance with the grass areas and walkways forming the shape of lotus flowers. According to the Ho Chi Minh City Department of Transportation, by the end of 2022, the only inland waterway transport services being operated at Bach Dang Quay are the Saigon Waterbus and the hydrofoil service to Vũng Tàu.

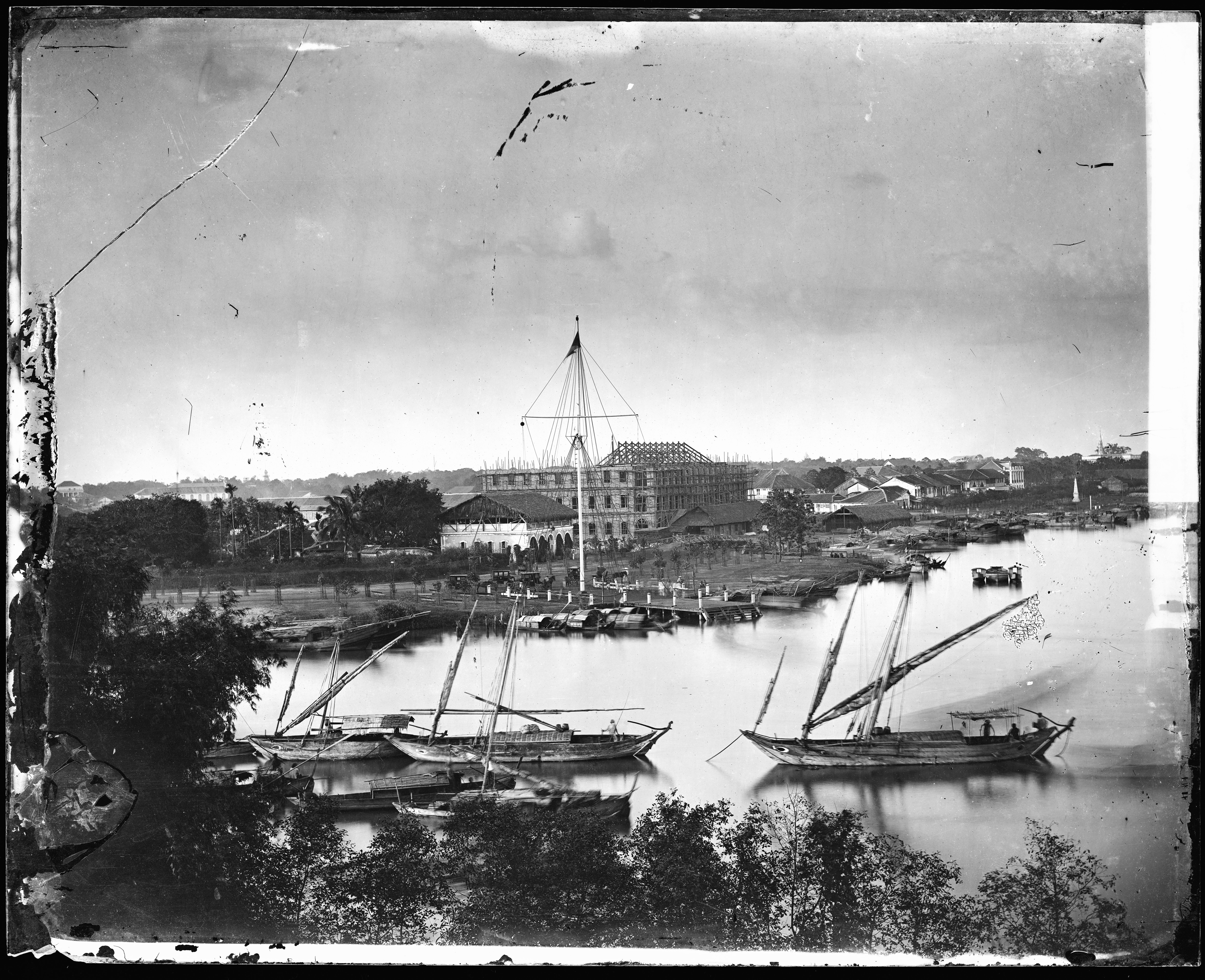
View of the quay in 1867

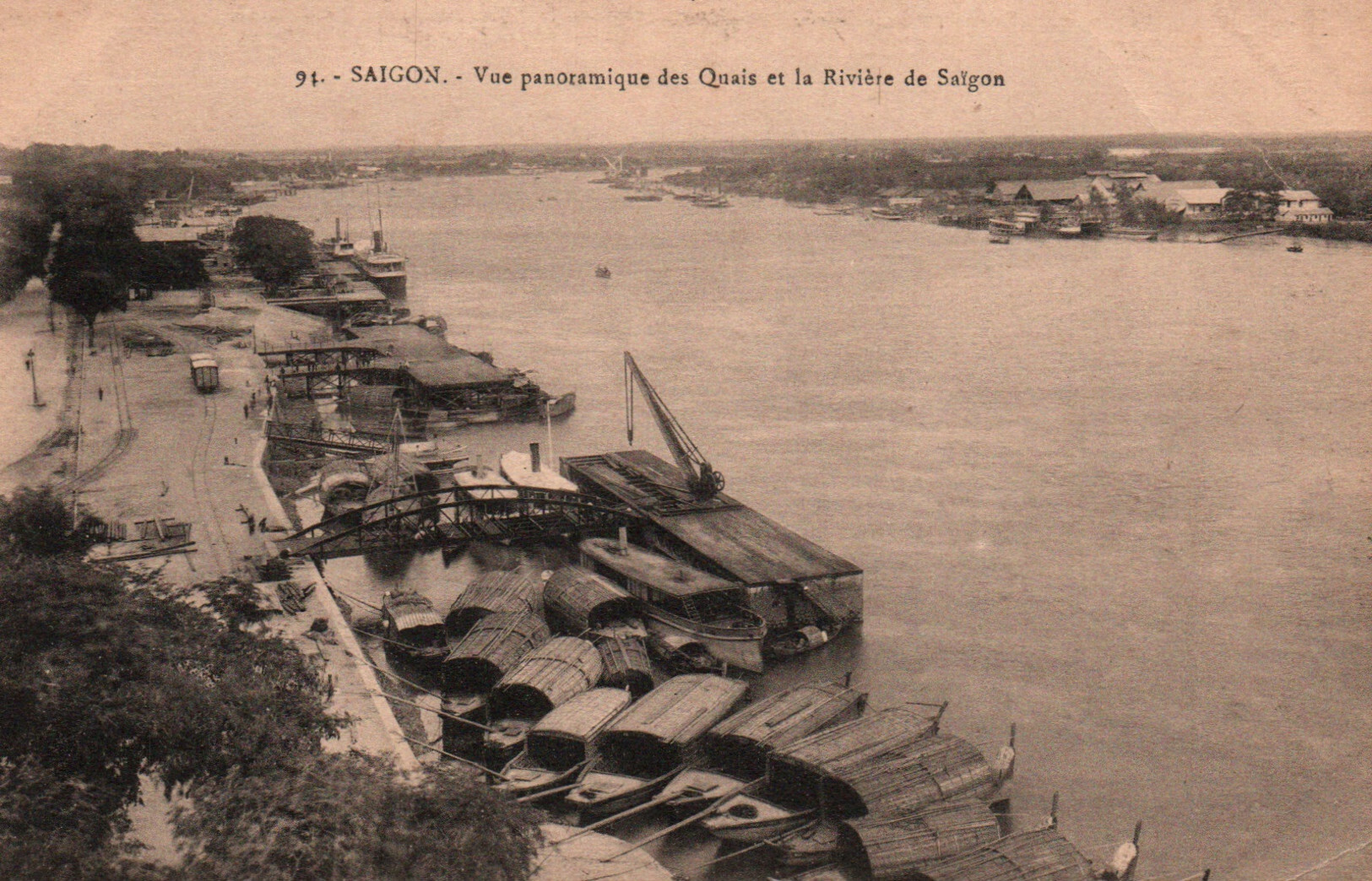
View of the quay in early 20th century

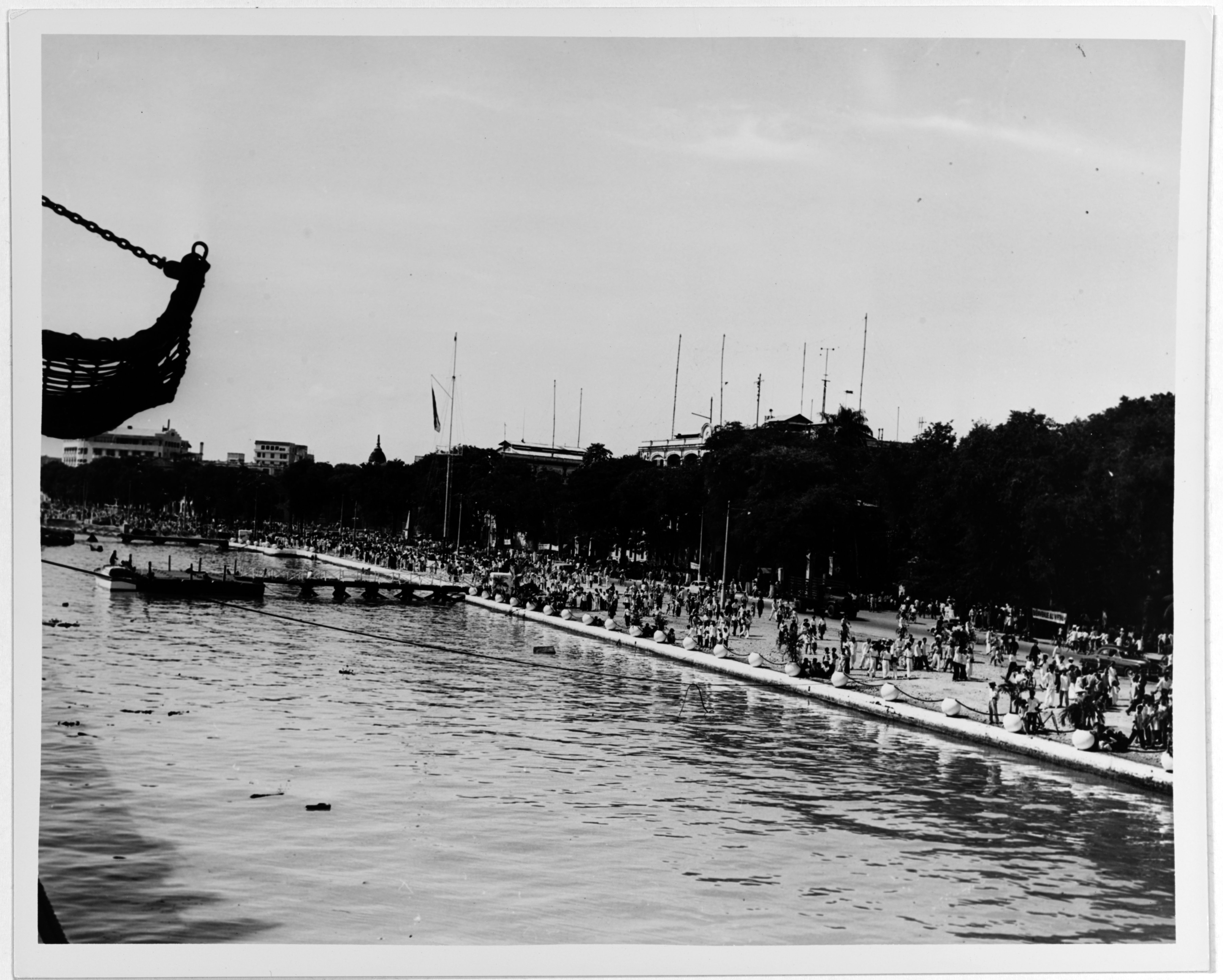
View of the Navy port in 1956

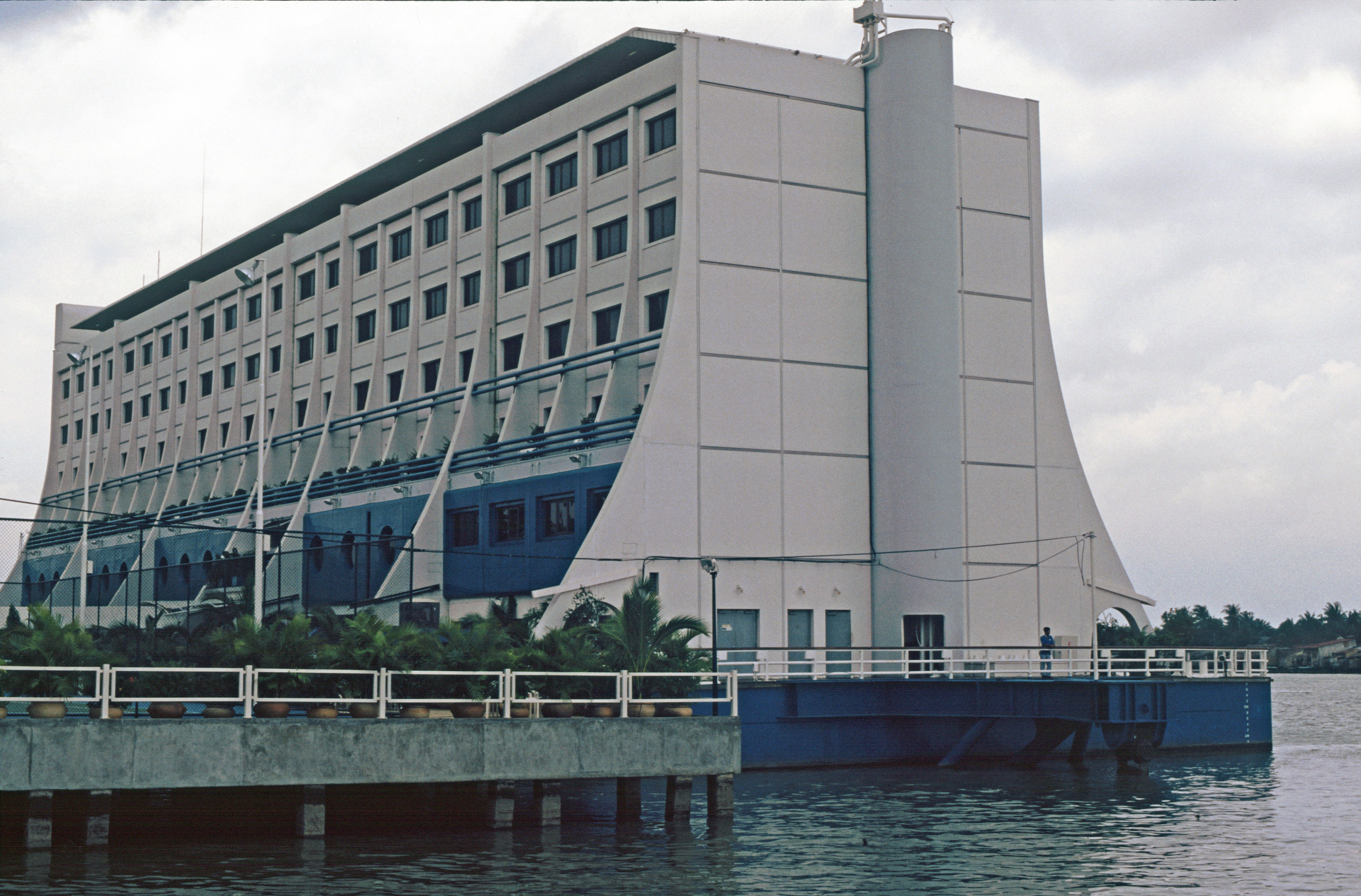
Saigon Floating Hotel near Tran Hung Dao statue in 1991

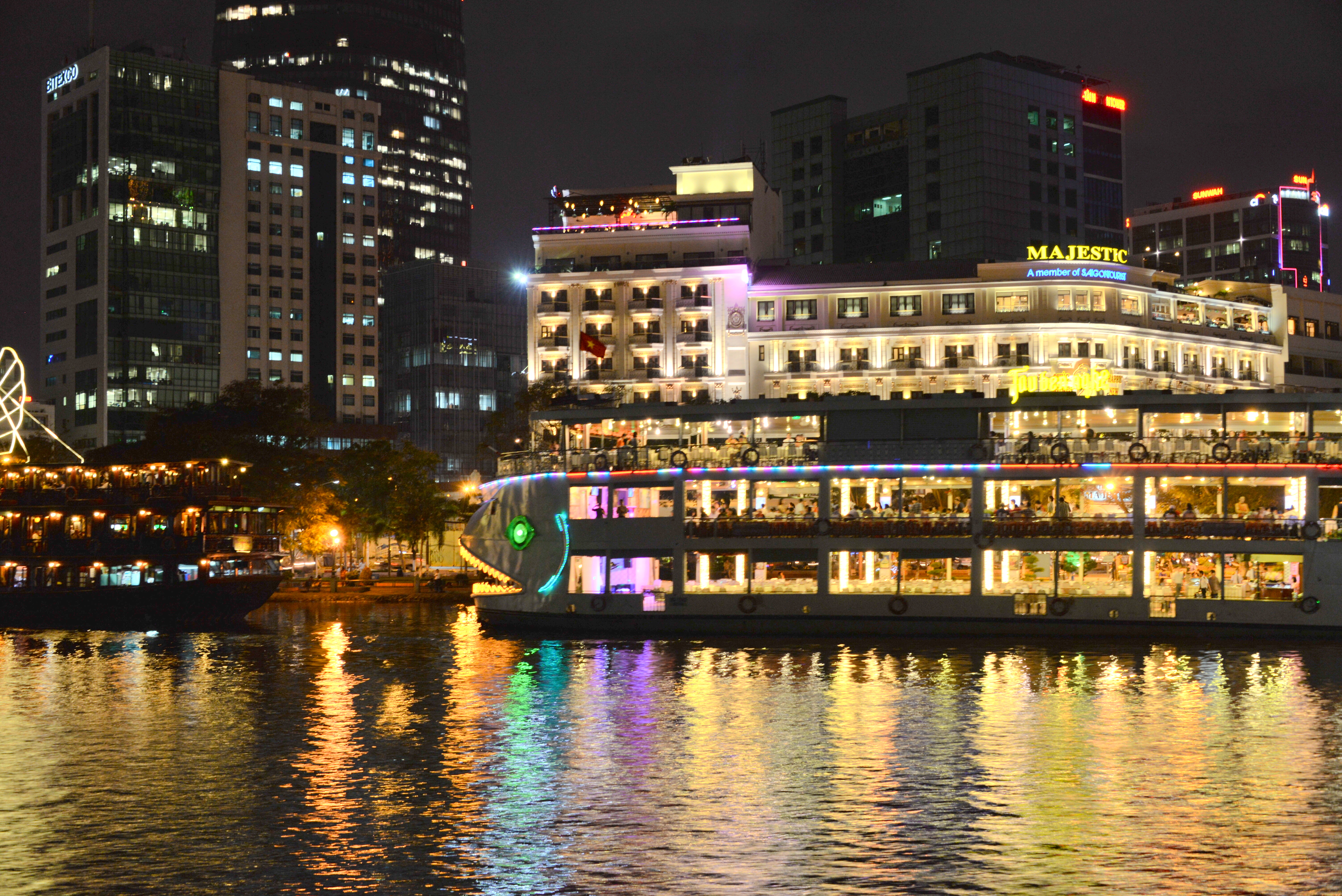
Floating restaurants at Bach Dang Quay in 2015

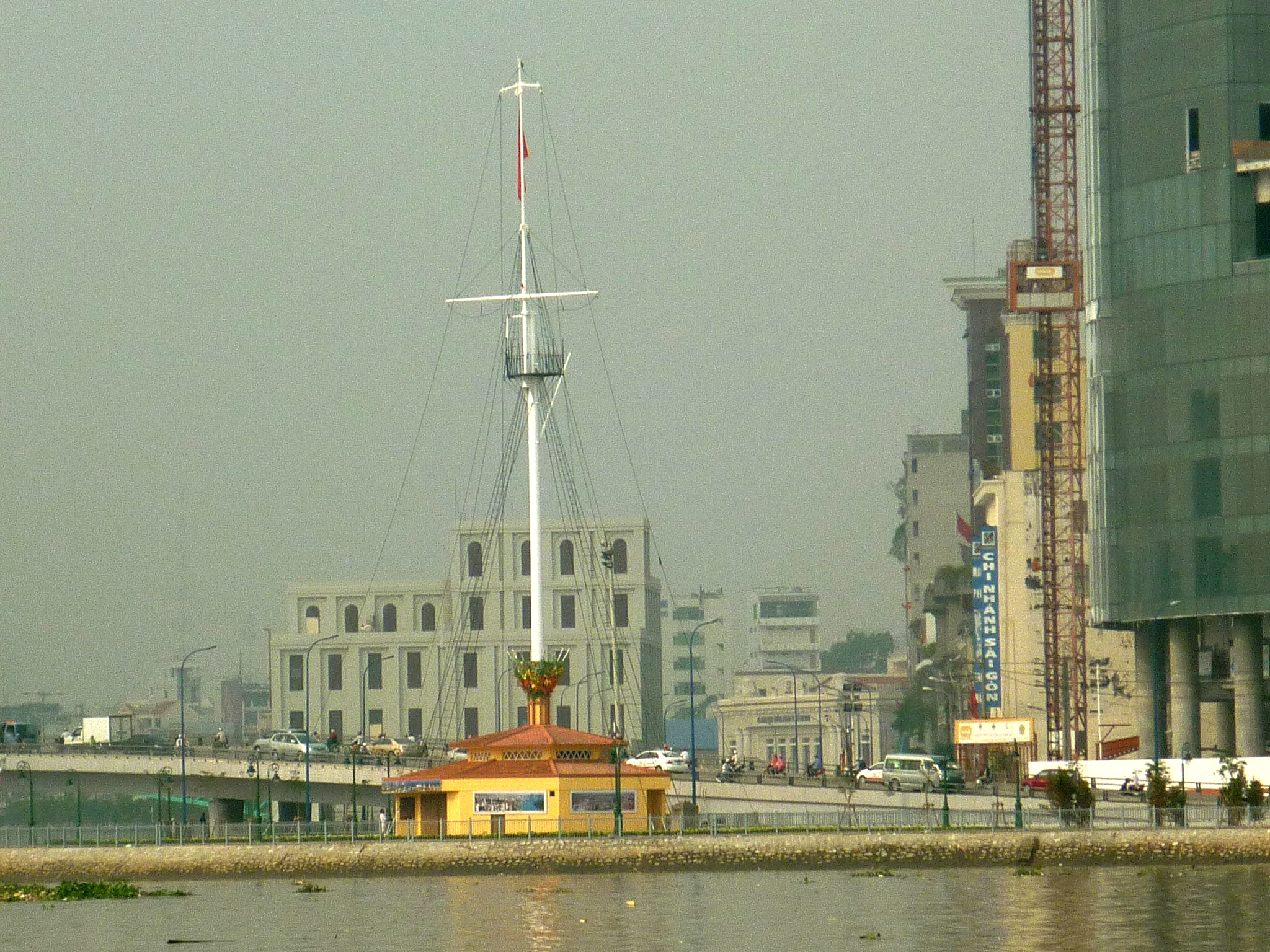
Thủ Ngữ flagpole, behind is the ventilation tower of Thủ Thiêm Tunnel

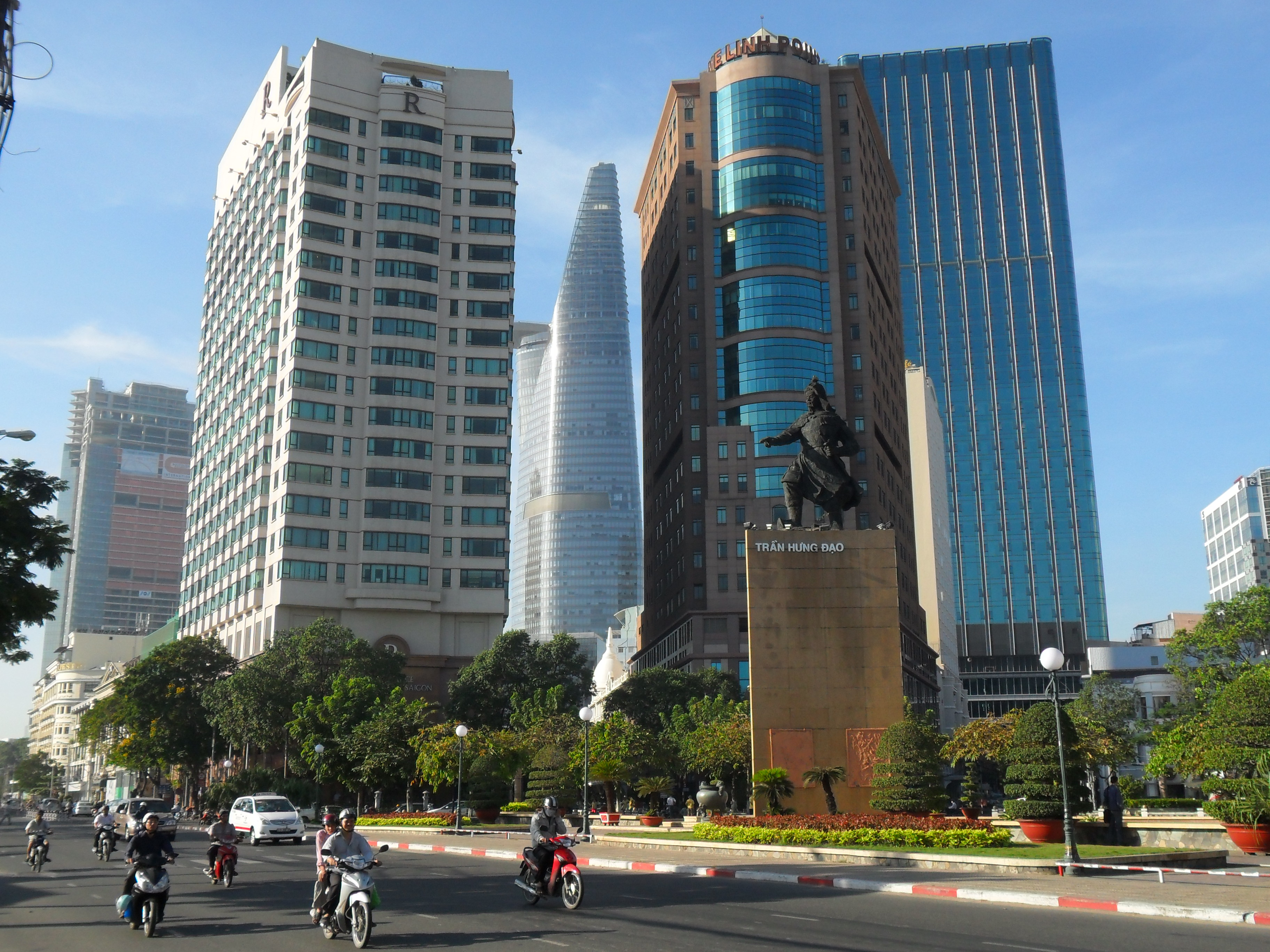
Statue of Saint Trần Hưng Đạo at Mê Linh square in 2012

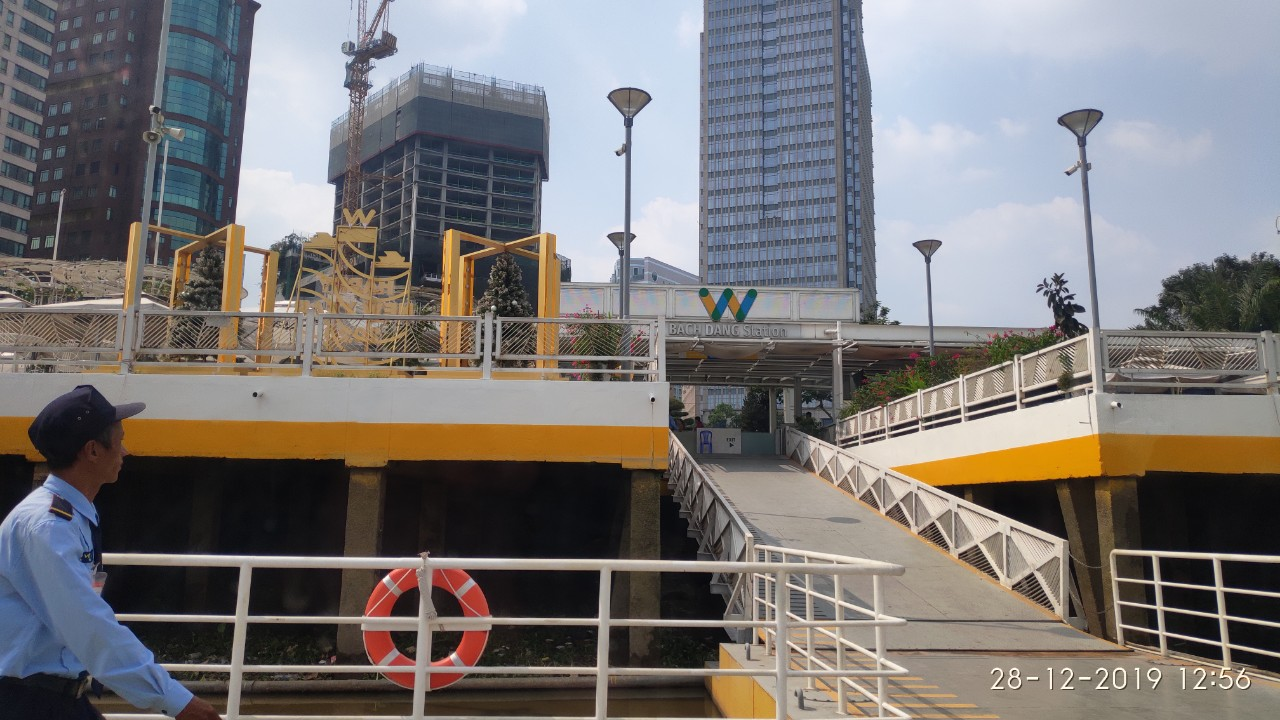
Saigon Waterbus, Bạch Đằng station

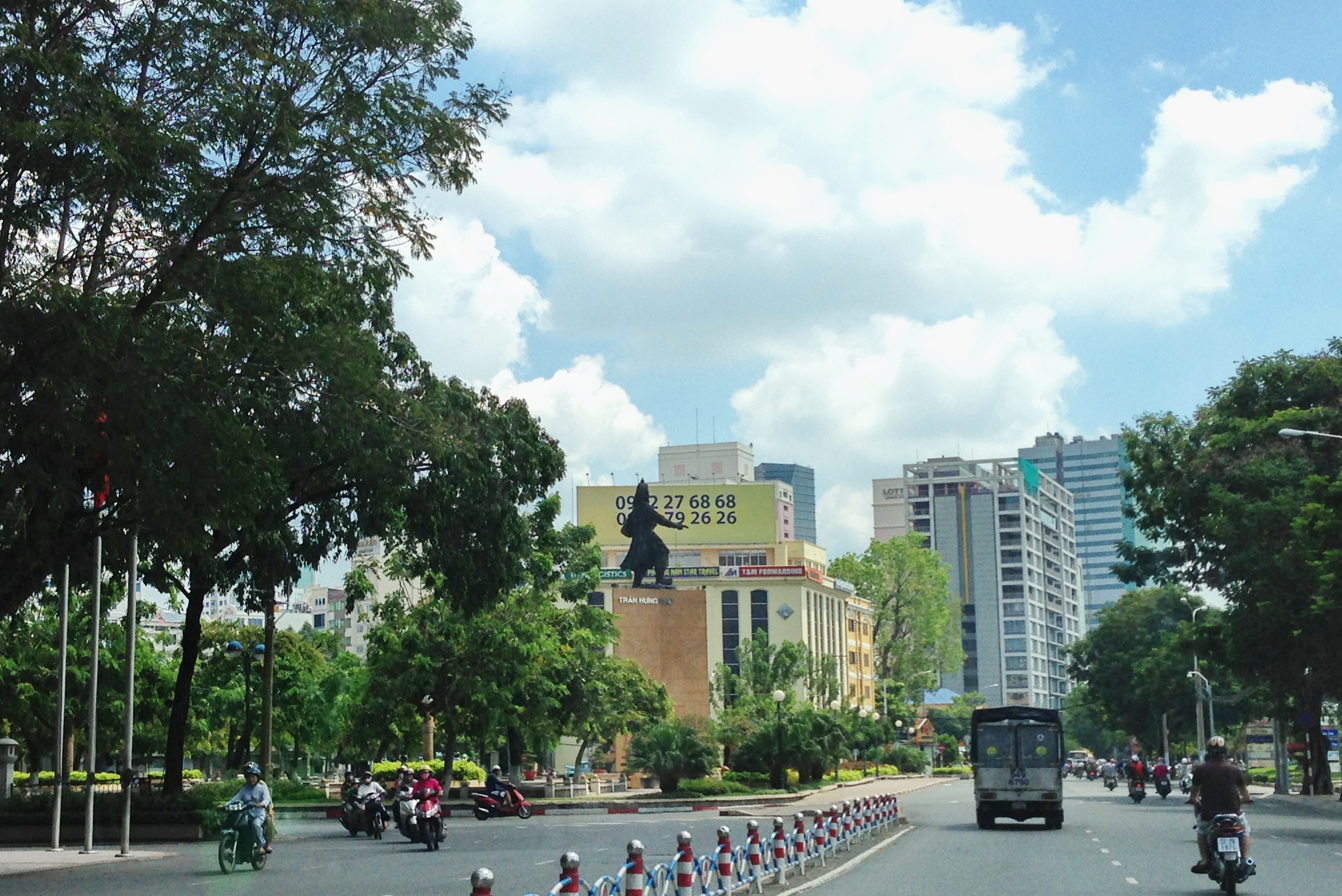
Tôn Đức Thắng Street in 2013

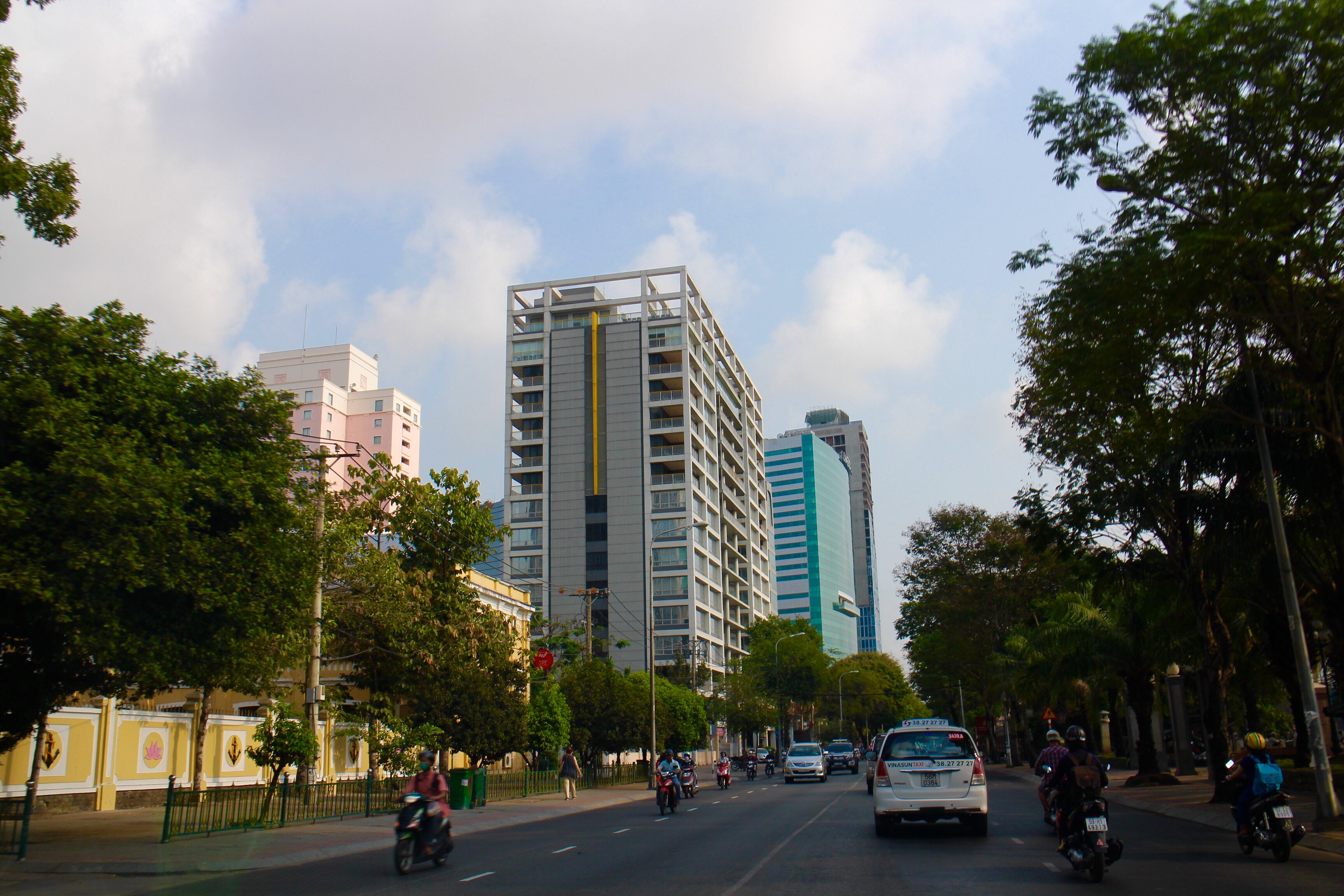
Tôn Đức Thắng Street in 2015

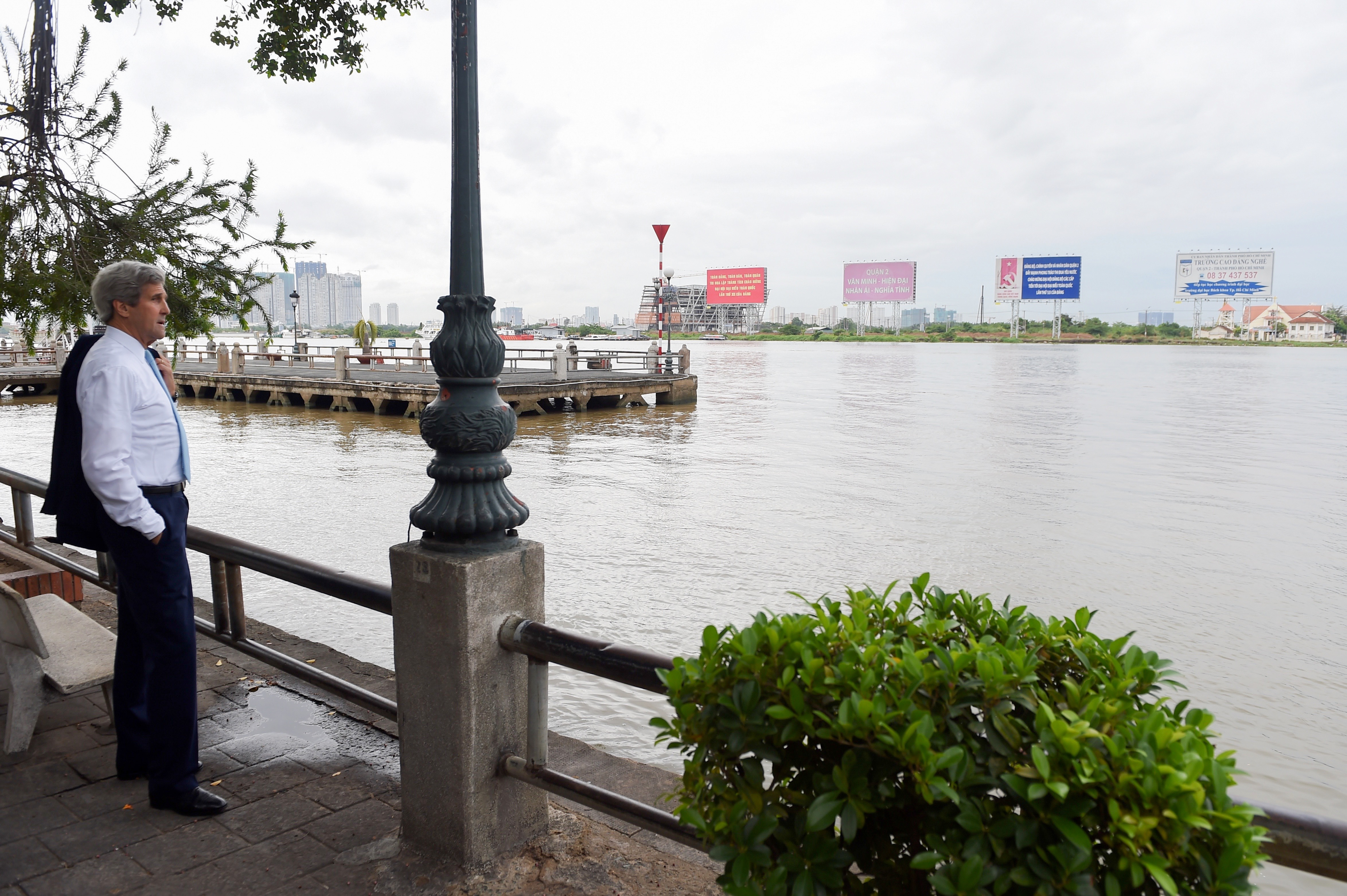
The 68th United States Secretary of State, John Kerry sightseeing at the Bạch Đằng Quay during his visit to the nation in 2015

== See also ==
- Mê Linh Square
- Saigon Naval Shipyard
- Tôn Đức Thắng Boulevard
