= Saigon Waterbus =

Transportation service in Ho Chi Minh City, Vietnam

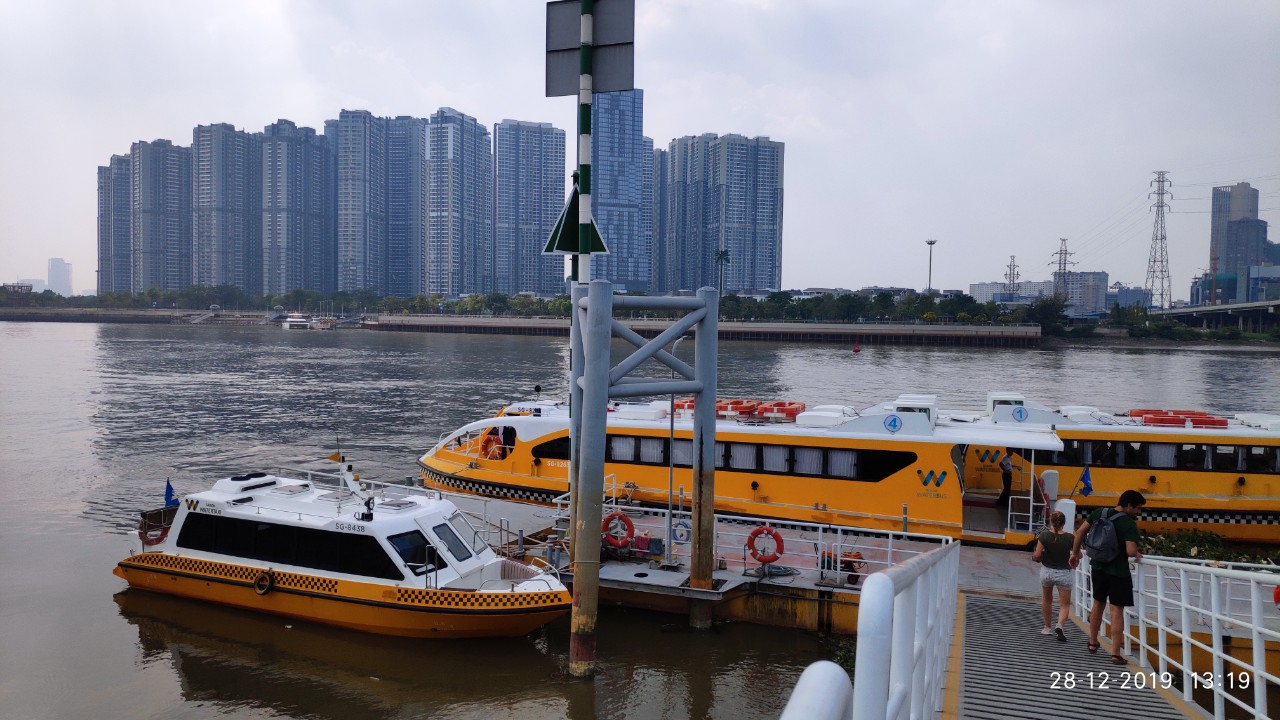
Bus in the Binh An station

The Saigon Waterbus (Vietnamese: Buýt đường sông Thành phố Hồ Chí Minh) is a transportation service in Ho Chi Minh City, Vietnam operating on the Saigon River. Launched in November 2017, the Waterbus offers services between Saigon and Thủ Đức wards. In 2021, the Waterbus launched an evening service from 5:00-9:00 PM.

== Piers ==
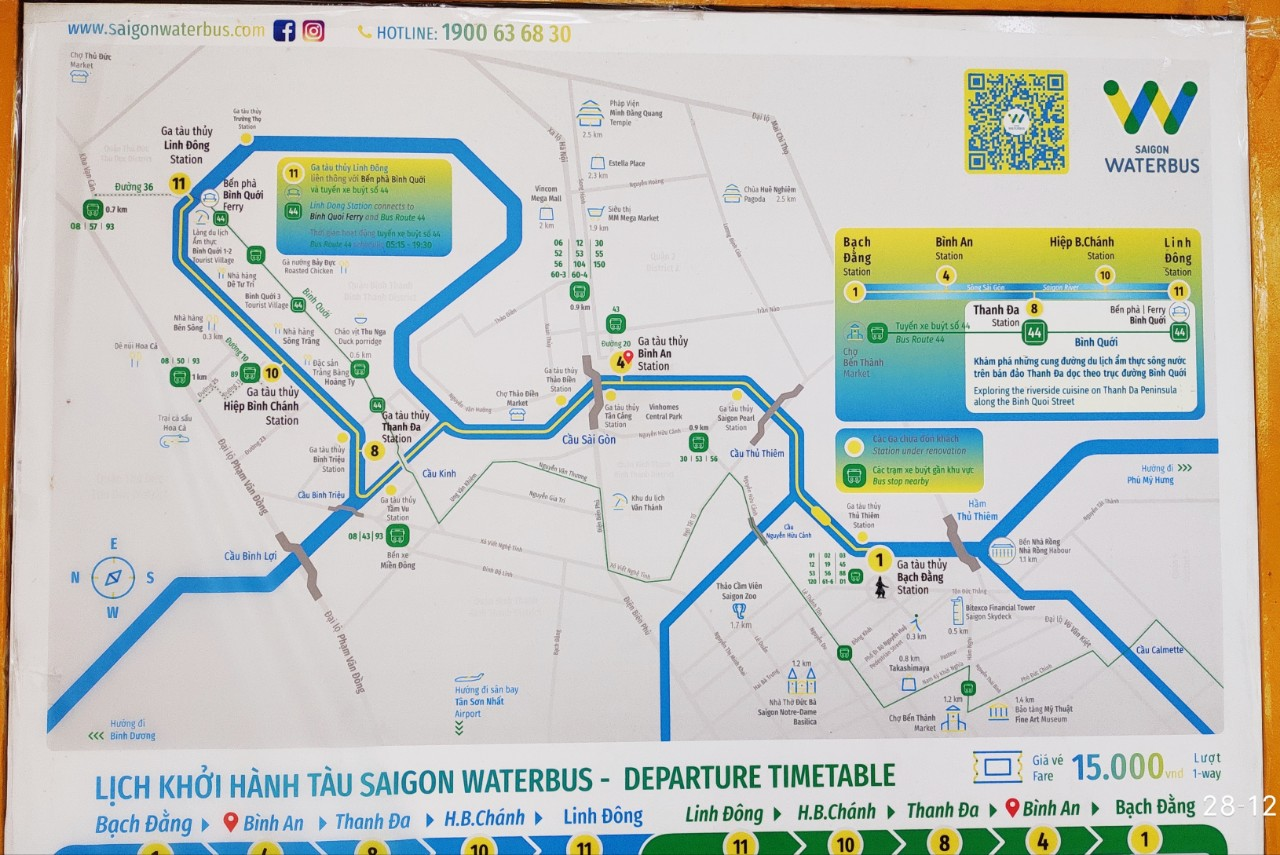
Waterbus pier map

Pier	Transfers	Location
Bach Dang	Saigon-Vung Tau Ferry	Saigon Ward
Thu Thiem		An Khanh Ward
Binh An		An Khanh Ward
Thanh Da		Binh Quoi Ward
Hiep Binh Chanh		Hiep Binh Ward
Linh Dong		Thu Duc Ward
