= Eximbank (Vietnam) =

Vietnam Export Import Commercial Joint Stock Bank
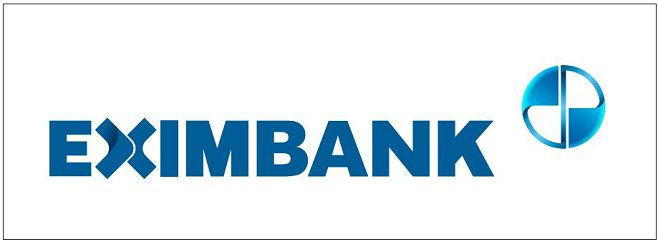
- Traded as: HOSE: EIB
- ISIN: VN000000EIB7
- Industry: Financial services
- Founded: May 24, 1989; 37 years ago
- Headquarters: 8th Floor - Vincom Center, 72 Le Thanh Ton and 45A Ly Tu Trong Street, District 1, Ho Chi Minh City
- Area served: Vietnam
- Key people: Đỗ Hà Phương; Trần Tấn Lộc
- Total assets: ▲191.337 billion VND (2023)
- Website: https://eximbank.com.vn/

Eximbank (Vietnamese: Ngân hàng thương mại cổ phần Xuất Nhập khẩu Việt Nam) was established on May 24, 1989, and is one of the first joint-stock commercial banks in Vietnam. Eximbank officially started operating on January 17, 1990.

== Scandal ==
On February 22, 2018, Eximbank announced that Le Nguyen Hung, former director of Eximbank's Ho Chi Minh City branch, was accused of forging documents and power of attorney to embezzle more than 245 billion VND from customer Chu Thi Binh and then fled abroad. According to Binh's lawyer, the signature of the authorized person was forged and Binh had never been to the bank to make the power of attorney.

On the morning of March 26, 2018, two customer service officers, Ho Ngoc Thuy and Nguyen Thi Thi, were arrested for allegedly being accomplices, helping Hung embezzle 245 billion VND in savings. In addition, three other employees were also prosecuted and banned from leaving their place of residence.

In October 2024, Vietcombank became the second largest shareholder of Eximbank.
