= Hanoi Highway =

Road in Vietnam

Hanoi Highway
- Quốc lộ 52
- Võ Nguyên Giáp (Stretch from Saigon Bridge to Station 2 interchange)
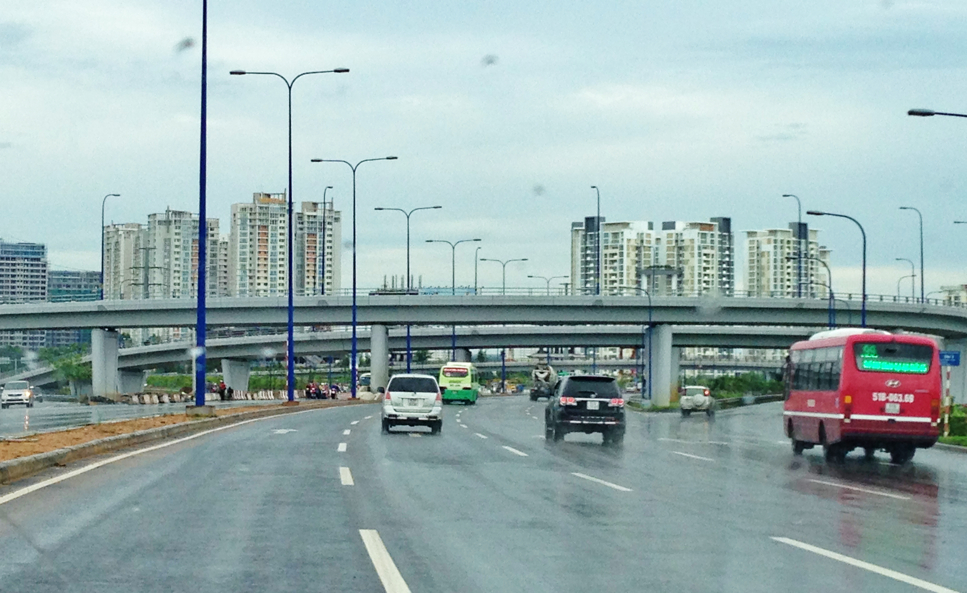
- Hanoi Highway at Cát Lái T-interchange in An Phú, Thủ Đức, direct to Saigon Bridge

Route information
- Part of AH1
- Length: 31 km (19 mi)
- Existed: April 1961–present
- Component highways: (from Station 2 junction to Chợ Sặt Y-intersection)

Major junctions
- North end: Chợ Sặt Y-junction, Long Bình, Đồng Nai
- Phạm Văn Thuận – Bùi Văn Hòa Street at Intersection of Tam Hiệp, Biên Hòa, Đồng Nai; AH17 at Vũng Tàu intersection, Long Bình Tân, Biên Hòa, Đồng Nai; Ring road 3 at Tân Vạn interchange, Dĩ An, Bình Dương; AH1 at Station 2 (or Thủ Đức) interchange, Tăng Nhơn Phú, Thủ Đức, Ho Chi Minh City; Ring Road 2 at Bình Thái Intersection, Phước Long, Thủ Đức, Ho Chi Minh City (Ready to be under construction); Mai Chí Thọ Highway (East–West Highway) at Cát Lái T-interchange, An Phú, Thủ Đức, Ho Chi Minh CIty
- South end: Saigon Bridge, An Khánh, Ho Chi Minh City

Location
- Country: Vietnam
- Provinces: Bình Dương, Đồng Nai
- Municipalities: Ho Chi Minh City
- Major cities: Thủ Đức, Dĩ An, Biên Hòa

Highway system
- Transport in Vietnam
← QL 51	→ QL 53

Hà Nội Highway or Hanoi Highway (Vietnamese: Xa lộ Hà Nội), also known as National Route 52 (Vietnamese: Quốc lộ 52), formerly called Biên Hòa Highway (Vietnamese: Xa lộ Biên Hòa), is the road linking Ho Chi Minh City and Biên Hòa.

== History ==
=== Saigon–Biên Hòa Highway ===
The Hanoi Highway, initially known as Biên Hòa Highway (or Saigon–Biên Hòa Highway) was constructed between July 1957 and April 1961, started at Phan Thanh Giản Bridge (now is Điện Biên Phủ Bridge) between District 1 and Bình Thạnh (before 1975 was Thạnh Mỹ Tây commune, Gò Vấp District, Province of Gia Định), crosses Nhieu Loc–Thi Nghe Channel and ends at Chợ Sặt T-intersection. The road was funded by American economic aid as a part of a massive nation building effort conducted over the course of the Vietnam War. The highway originally was nearly 32 kilometers long and 21 meters wide, spanning between the 4-way Hàng Xanh intersection and the Chợ Sặt Y-intersection of Highway 1A. At the time of its inauguration by President Ngo Dinh Diem, each direction had two lanes, and the highway had two major bridges: the Newport Bridge (the former name of Saigon Bridge; 982 m long) across the Saigon River and Đồng Nai Bridge (453 m long) across the Đồng Nai River, six intermediate bridges, drainage systems, and erosion and traffic controls. The highway was surfaced with asphalt, a relatively modern innovation.

Though the highway was constructed under the pretenses of economic development, there was suspicion that the highway had been built with the intent of military use. However, many countered that the presence of the highway would encourage local residents to build communities and open businesses along the roadside, a narrative that the United States happily adopted. All in all, paid for under the pretenses of non-military economic development, the road cost more than that which was spent on "labor, community development, social welfare, health, housing, and education combined for the period 1954-1961."

In 1971, improvements were made to accommodate for civilian use. The route was designed to prevent two-way travel.

=== Hanoi Highway ===
In 1984, the Biên Hòa Highway was renamed as Hanoi Highway on the 30th anniversary of the liberation of Hanoi. Another name of this route for the National Route system of Vietnam is National Route 52, commonly used to refer to the stretch from the Saigon Bridge to the intersection with National Route 1A (previously known as South Korea Highway) at Thủ Đức interchange (or commonly known as Station 2 interchange), next to Saigon Hi-Tech Park. Hanoi Highway goes through some market towns are: Thủ Đức, Hố Nai and Chợ Sặt (the two latter are in Biên Hoà city), the last one is located near the Chợ Sặt Y-intersection next to April 30 park, (intersection with Highway 1K, beyond the Tam Hiệp intersection).

Areas that the Hanoi highway passes through include, Thủ Đức of Ho Chi Minh City, Dĩ An City of Bình Dương province and Biên Hòa City of Đồng Nai province.

With the economic situation in Ho Chi Minh City and the region growing, Hanoi Highway has become overcrowded in recent years, that the route would be extended up to 140 m. This project is planned to be initiated in 2009 with a project to expand Highway 51. According to the project, the construction period is 2 years initially.

== Metro Line 1 ==
Thủ Đức station pedestrian bridge

The Ho Chi Minh City Metro Line 1 has a stretch runs along the Hanoi Highway in Thủ Đức, from the Saigon Bridge to the New Eastern Bus Terminus (borders of Dĩ An, Bình Dương and Thủ Đức, Ho Chi Minh City), then turn right to Long Bình Depot. Furthermore, both provinces of Bình Dương and Đồng Nai will extend the line along the rest of the highway.

List of stations of Line 1 on Hanoi Highway, in direction from Ben Thanh station: Tan Cang (next to Saigon Bridge in Bình Thạnh), Thao Dien, An Phu, Rach Chiec, Phuoc Long, Binh Thai, Thu Duc, High Tech Park, National University, Suoi Tien Terminal. The stretch between Tan Cang and An Phu will be coincided with Line 5.

== Route information ==
=== Width and lanes ===
Hanoi Highway passes through the areas of Thủ Đức and Dĩ An, Ho Chi Minh City and Biên Hòa area of Đồng Nai. The section from Saigon Bridge to Thủ Đức intersection has been renamed Võ Nguyên Giáp Boulevard.

- Section 1 from Saigon Bridge to Bình Thái interchange (153.5m width): 16 lanes (10 main lanes, 6 parallel lanes).
- Section 2 from Bình Thái interchange to Thủ Đức intersection (113.5m width): 14 to 16 lanes (10 main lanes, 6 parallel lanes).
- Section 3 from Thủ Đức intersection to Tân Vạn Y-interchange (part of, 113.5m width): 14 to 16 lanes (8 main lanes, 6 to 8 parallel lanes)
- Section 4 from Tân Vạn Y-interchange to Chợ Sặt Y-intersection (part of): 6 lanes.

=== Bridges ===
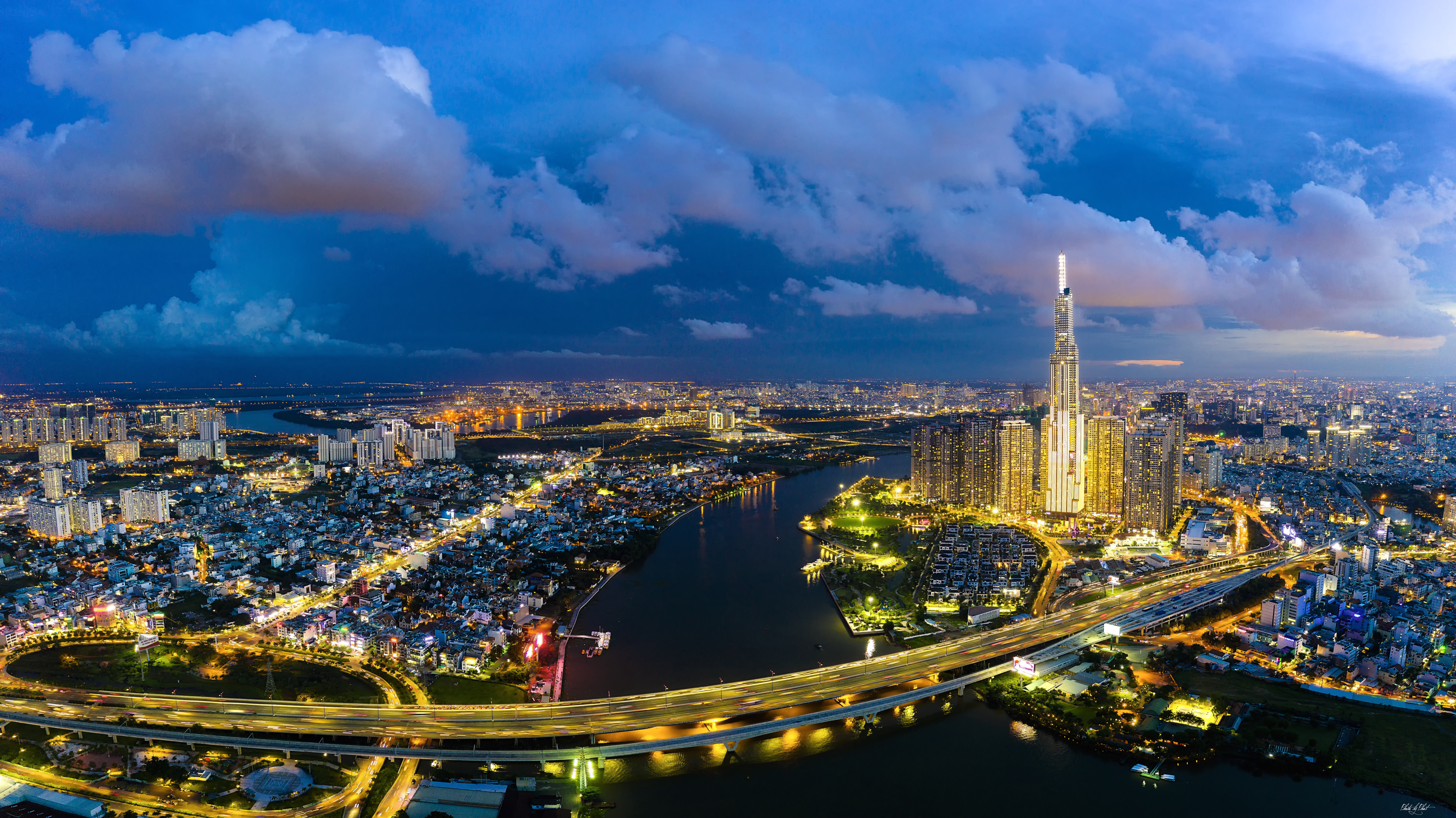
Saigon Bridge crosses Saigon River links An Khánh and Thạnh Mỹ Tây

- Saigon Bridge: 12 lanes, crosses Saigon River
- Rạch Chiếc Bridge: 10 lanes, crosses Chiếc Canal
- Suối Cái Bridge: 14 lanes, crosses Cái Steam
- Đồng Nai Bridge: 9 lanes, crosses Đồng Nai River
- Suối Linh Bridge: 6 lanes, crosses Linh Steam
- Hang Bridge: 6 lanes, crosses North–South railway open tunnel

=== Overpasses and tunnels ===
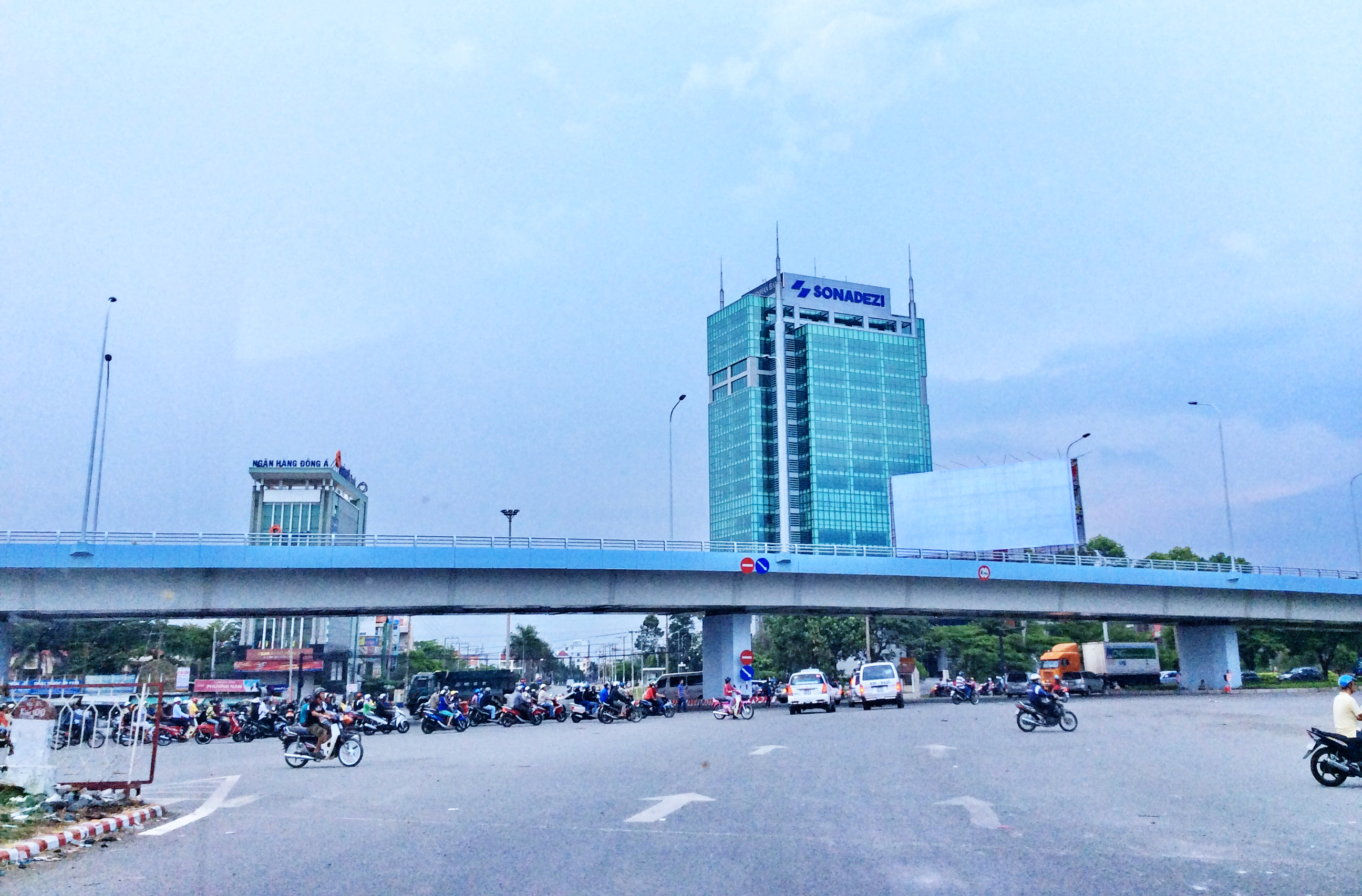
Vũng Tàu junction overpass through National Route 51 in Trấn Biên

- Thủ Đức intersection overpass: 4 lanes (no motorbikes)
- Station 2 interchange: 8 lanes
- Open tunnel at the National University intersection: 8 lanes
- Tân Vạn interchange overpass: 4 lanes
- Vũng Tàu junction overpass: 4 lanes
- Tam Hiệp tunnel: 4 lanes
- Cầu vượt AMATA overpass: 4 lanes

== Notable sites ==
=== Ho Chi Minh City ===
- Saigon Bridge Park
- Rạch Chiếc Bridge Park and Memorial
- Thảo Điền: Vincom Mega Mall Thảo Điền
- An Phú: Lumière Riverside Towers, The Vista An Phú, Somerset Vista Ho Chi Minh City, Estella Heights & Estella Place, Cantavil Premier An Phú, MM Mega Market An Phú (formely Metro)
- Thủ Đức: Thủ Đức University Village Villas, Ho Chi Minh City University of Technology and Engineering
- Linh Xuân: Thủ Đức Water Plant, Coca-Cola Vietnam Headquarters, Vietnam National University, Ho Chi Minh City
- Tăng Nhơn Phú: Saigon Hi-Tech Park (SHTP), Ho Chi Minh City Oncology Hospital, Suối Tiên Theme Park
- Long Bình: New Eastern Bus Terminus, Ho Chi Minh City Martyrs' Cemetery, National Historical and Cultural Park
- Đông Hòa: Bình Dương Port, VNU-HCM Stone Lake, Bình An People's Cemetery

=== Đồng Nai ===
- Sonadezi Tower (Trấn Biên)
- Biên Hòa Industrial Park
- Go! Đồng Nai Hypermarket (Long Hưng)
- Tam Hiệp: Tam Hiệp Park, Đồng Nai Children Hospital
- Long Bình: Lotte Mart Đồng Nai, AMATA Industrial Park, April 30 Park, Hanoi Parish Church, Sặt Market

== Gallery ==
Hanoi Highway, heading from SHTP towards Saigon Bridge

Đồng Nai Bridge towards Trấn Biên

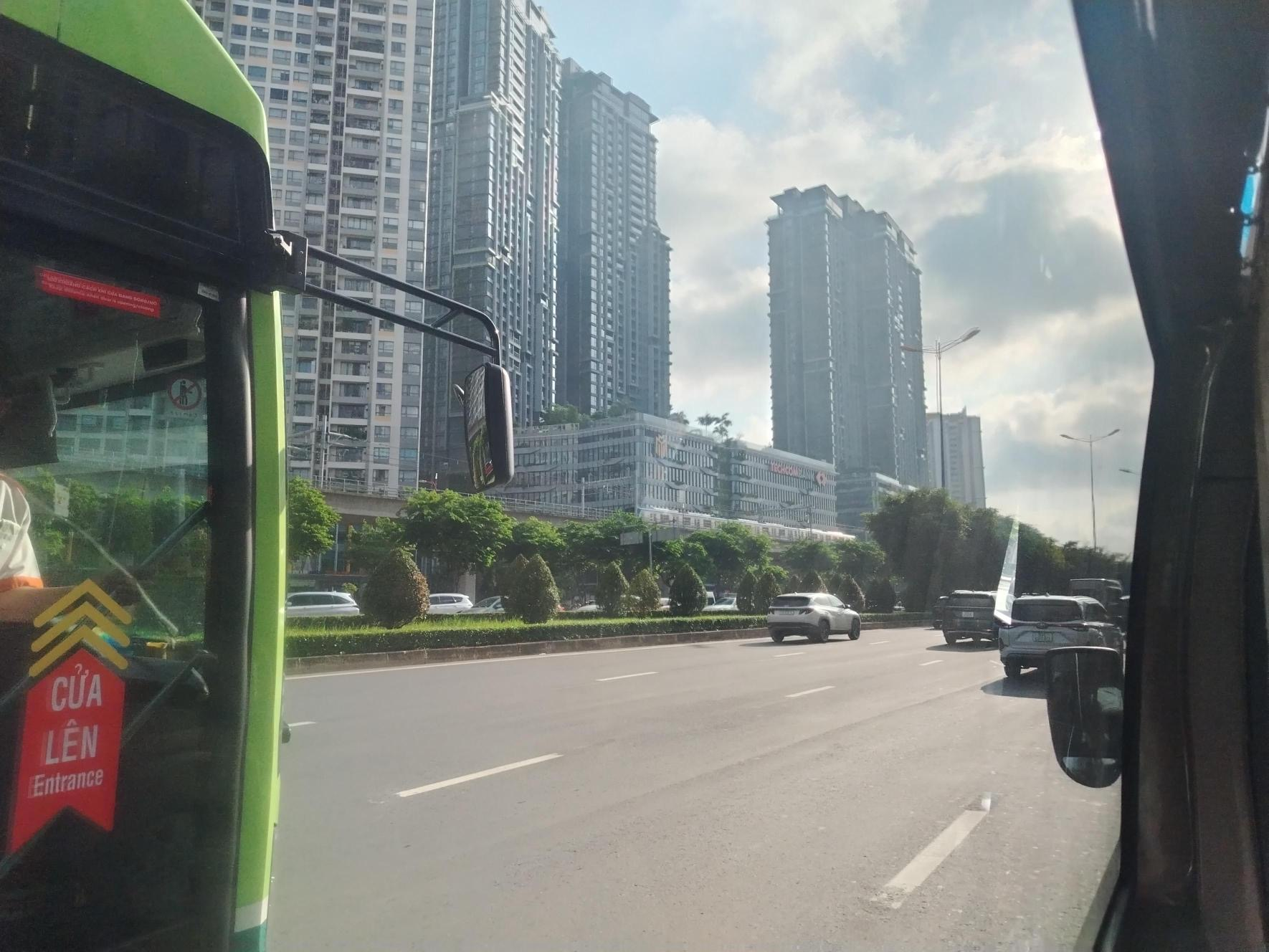
Lumière Riverside Towers

Rạch Chiếc Bridge

An old villa no longer exists at 79–81 Hanoi Highway, Thảo Điền in 2012

Pháp Viện Minh Đăng Quang, Cát Lái intersection
