= Biên Hòa (city) =

- Provincial city (Class-1)
- Biên Hòa City; Thành phố Biên Hòa
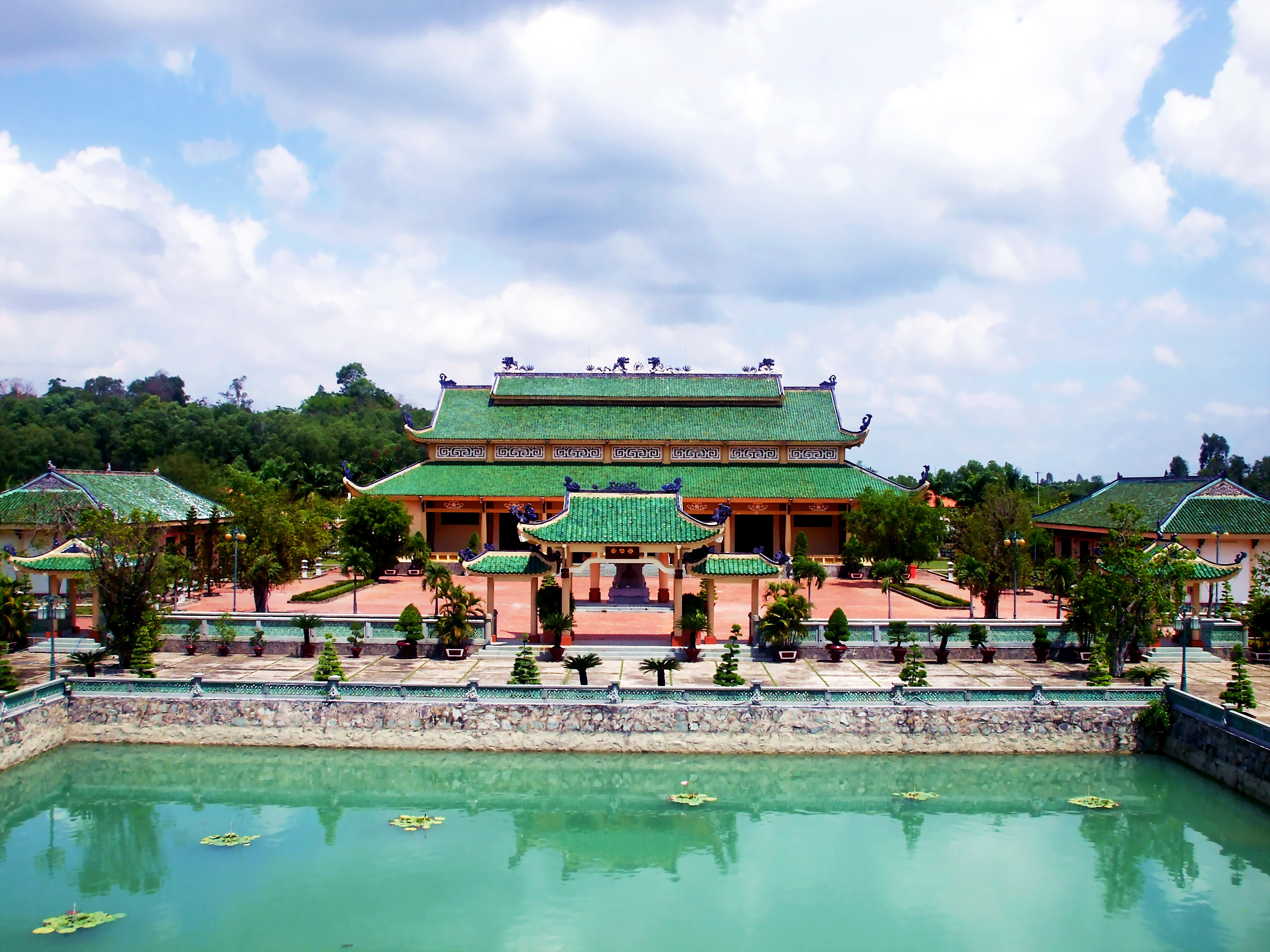
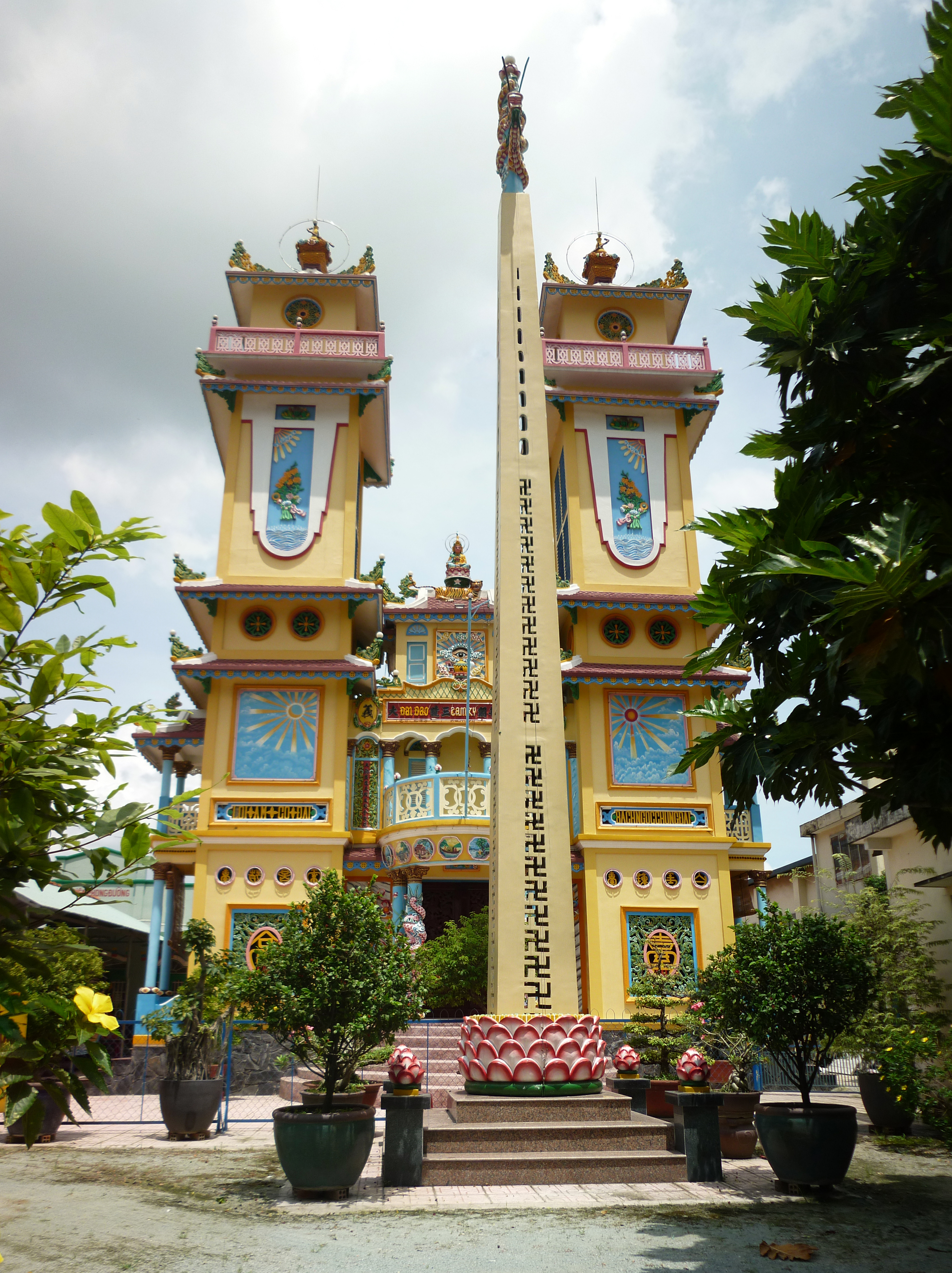
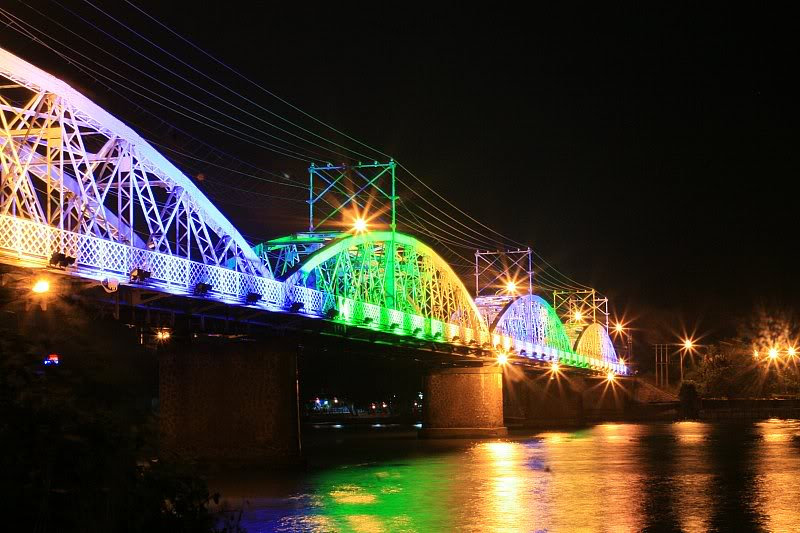
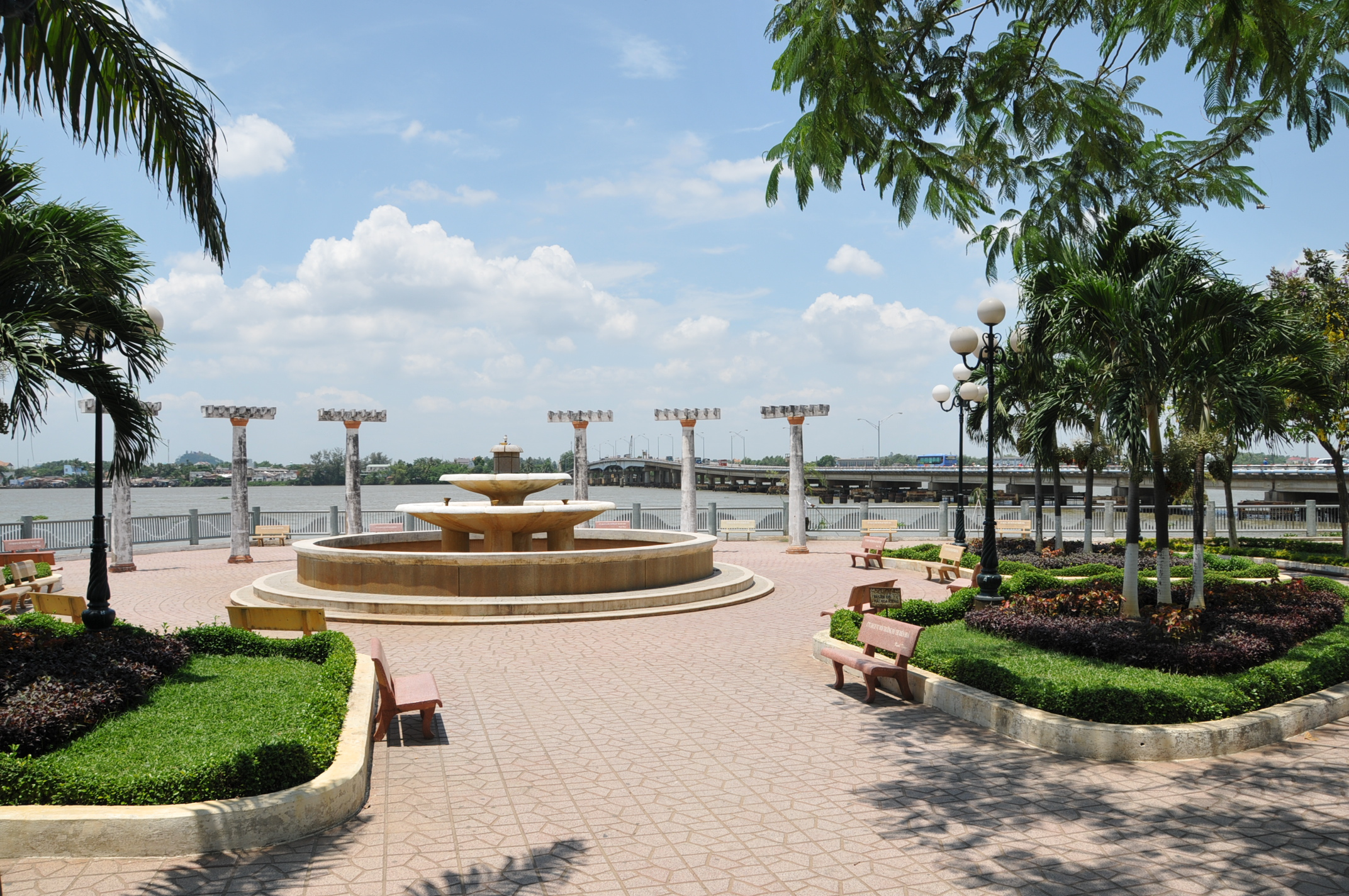
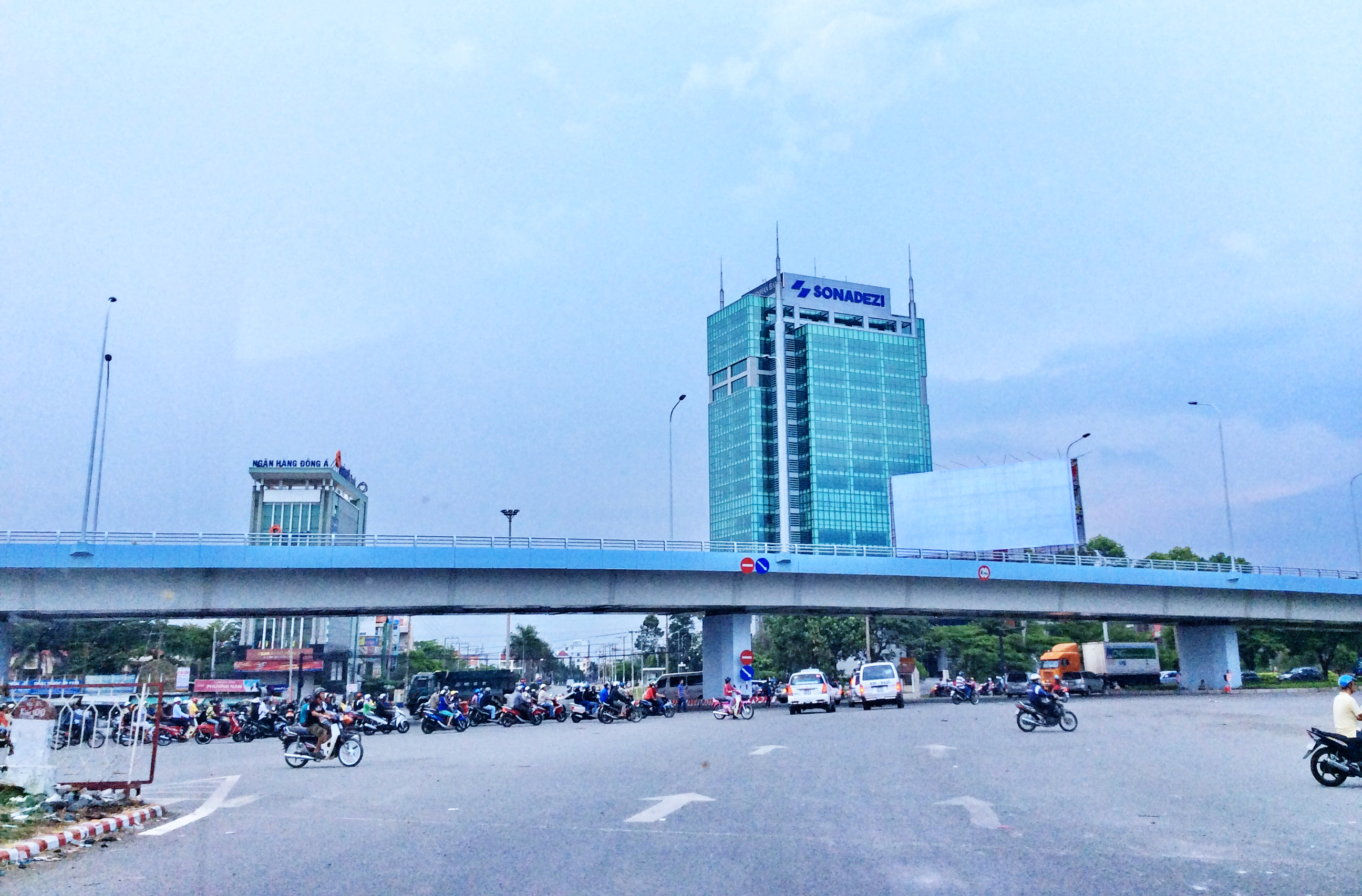
- From left to right, from top to bottom: Trấn Biên Temple of Literature, Buddha Mau Buu Hoa shrine, Ghềnh bridge, Nguyễn Văn Trị Riverside Park, Sonadezi Tower at Vũng Tàu intersection

- Seal
- Interactive map of Biên Hòa
- Location of in Vietnam
- Coordinates: 10°57′N 106°49′E
- Country: Vietnam
- Province: Đồng Nai
- Region: Southeast

Area
  - Total: 263.62 km^{2} (101.78 sq mi)

Population (2022)
  - Total: 1,272,235
  - Density: 4,826/km^{2} (12,500/sq mi)

Metro GDP (PPP, constant 2015 values)
  - Year: 2023
  - Total: $19.8 billion
  - Per capita: $17,800
- Climate: Aw

Biên Hòa (Northern accent:, Southern accent:) is a former city in Vietnam and was the capital city of Đồng Nai Province. Situated northeast of Ho Chi Minh City (also known as Saigon), Biên Hòa is connected to it via Hanoi Highway (part of National Route 1). As a class-1 provincial city, it is the sixth largest city in Vietnam by population.

Biên Hòa ceased to exist as a municipal city on 1 July 2025, following the elimination of district level units in Vietnam, and became a part of the Đồng Nai Province.

== Geography ==
=== Topography ===
Biên Hòa spans 264 square kilometers (102 sq mi) of midland terrain in western Đồng Nai Province. The majority of the city is situated to the east of the Đồng Nai River.

Biên Hòa shares its borders with:

- Trảng Bom district to the east
- Bình Dương Province to the west
- Long Thành district and Ho Chi Minh City to the south
- Vĩnh Cửu district to the North

=== Administrative divisions ===
Biên Hòa has 25 divisions (24 wards and 1 commune), including:

- An Bình
- An Hòa
- Bình Đa
- Bửu Hòa
- Bửu Long
- Hiệp Hòa
- Hóa An
- Hố Nai
- Long Bình
- Long Bình Tân
- Phước Tân
- Quang Vinh
- Tam Hiệp
- Tam Phước
- Tân Biên
- Tân Hạnh
- Tân Hòa
- Tân Hiệp
- Tân Mai
- Tân Phong
- Tân Vạn
- Thống Nhất
- Trảng Dài
- Trung Dũng
- Commune of Long Hưng

== Demographics ==
In 1989, Biên Hòa's population was estimated at 273,879. By 1999, it had grown to 435,400 and reached 701,194 in 2009. In December 2012, the city's population surpassed 1 million. By 2019, it had increased to 1,055,414.

As of 2022, the city's population was 1,272,235.

== History ==
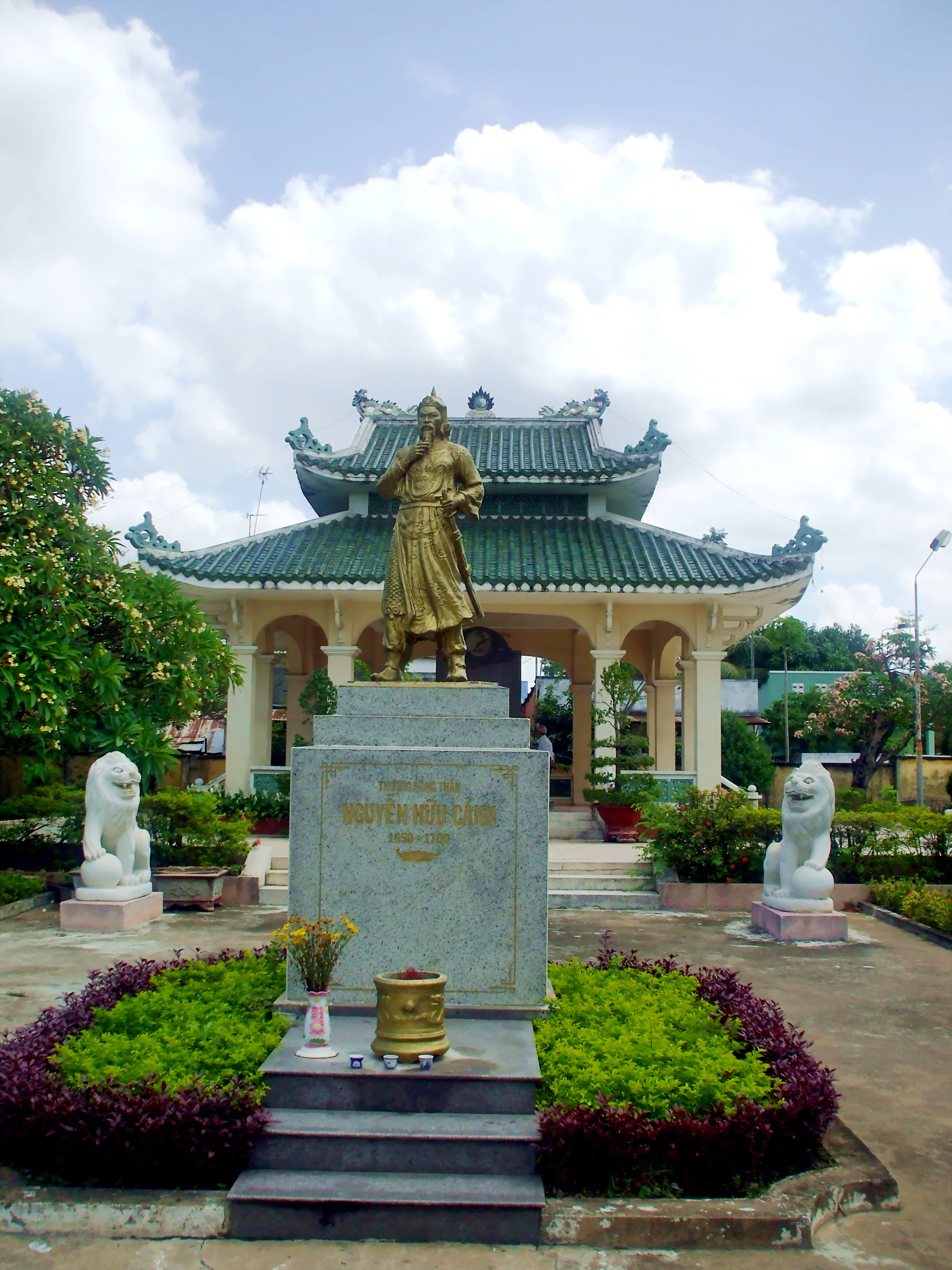
Nguyễn Hữu Cảnh temple in Cù Lao Phố.

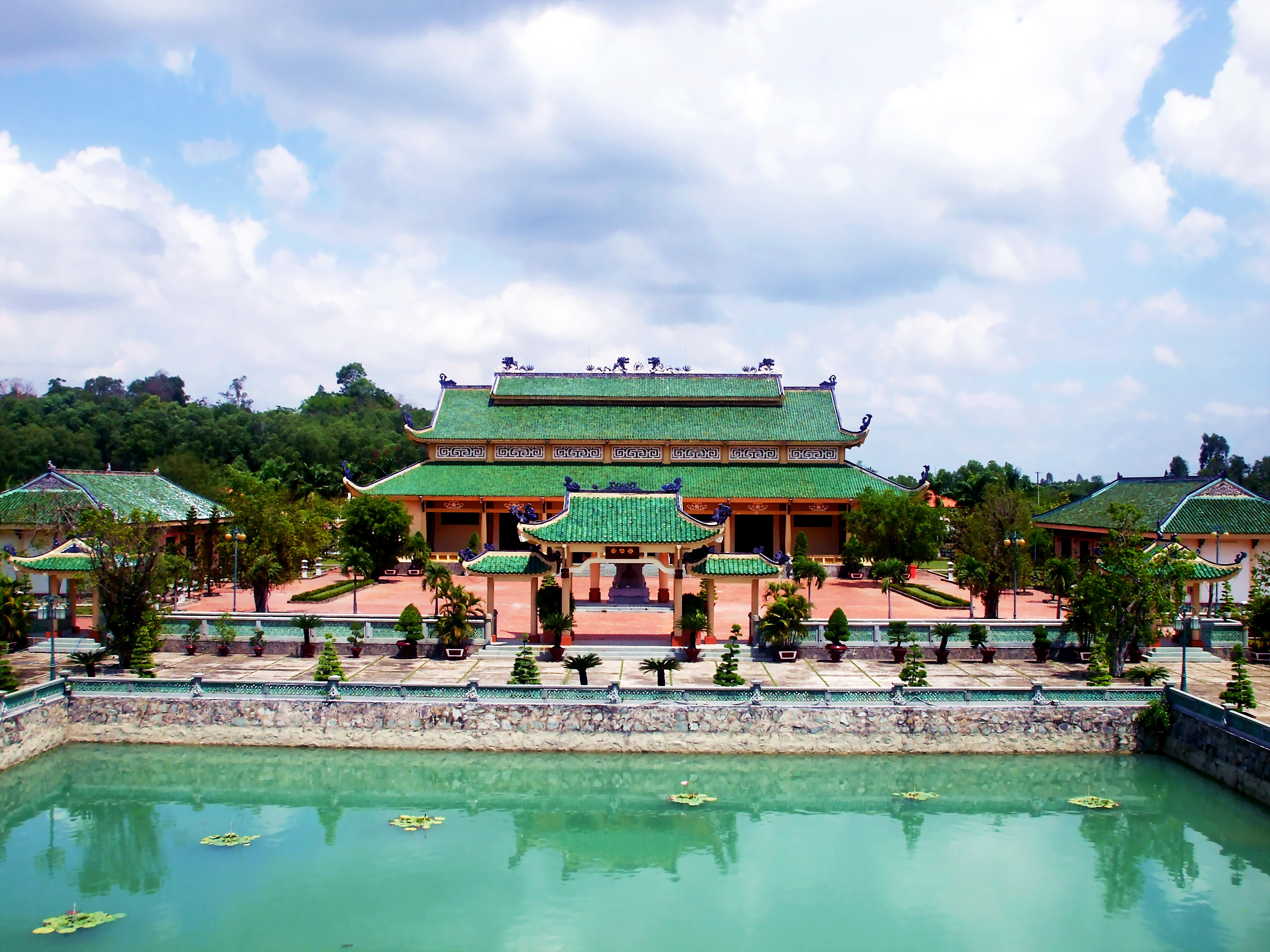
Trấn Biên Temple of Literature, a Vietnamese Confucian temple.

=== Nguyễn dynasty ===
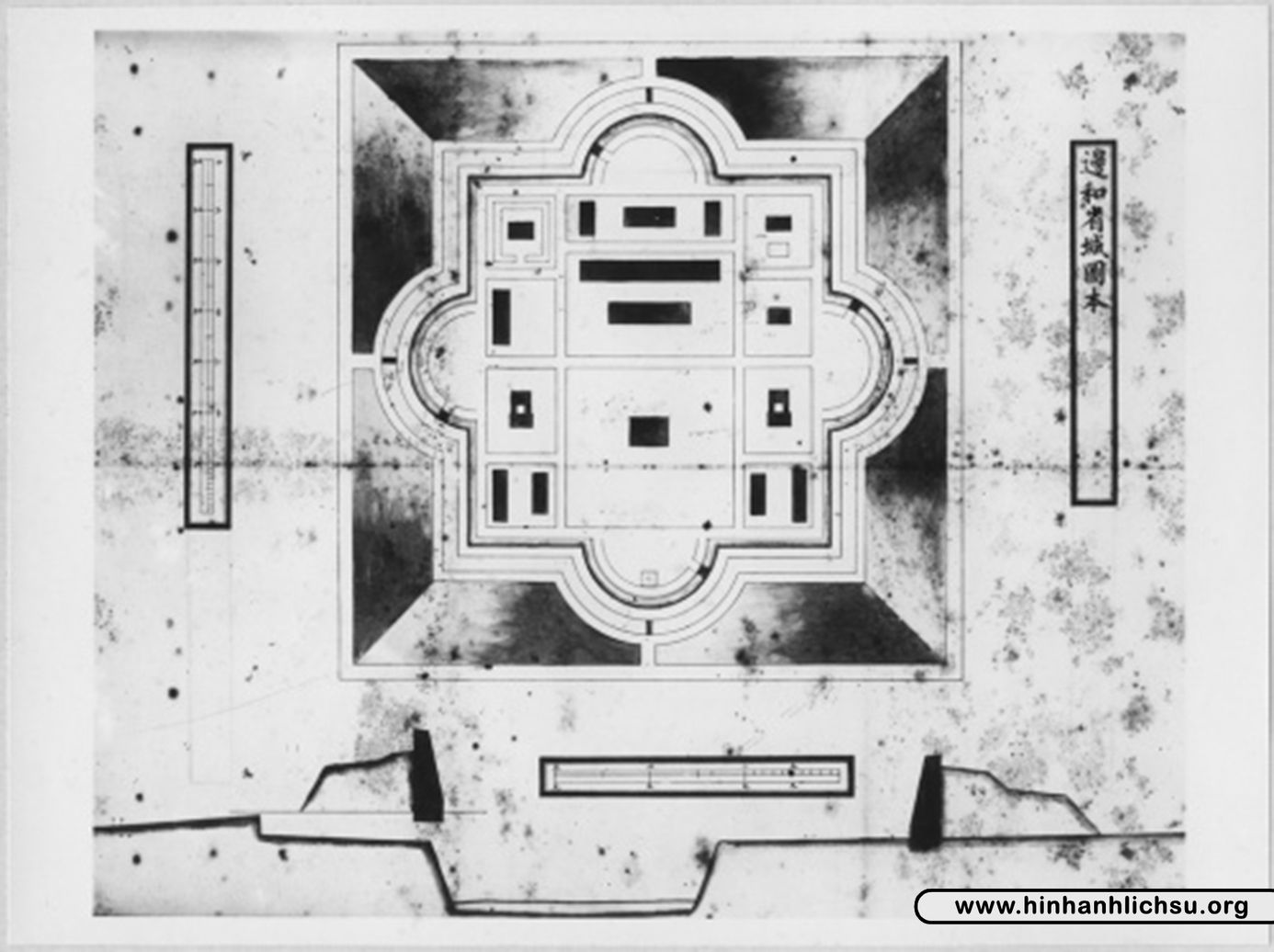
Drawing of Biên Hòa citadel in the Nguyễn dynasty

The capture of Biên Hòa on 16 December 1861, was an important allied victory in the Cochinchina Campaign (1858–1862). This campaign, fought between the French and the Spanish on the one side and the Vietnamese (under the Nguyễn dynasty) on the other, began as a limited punitive expedition and ended as a French war of conquest. The war concluded with the establishment of the French colony of Cochinchina, a development that inaugurated nearly a century of French colonial dominance in Vietnam.

=== Republic of Vietnam ===
Biên Hòa grew into a major suburb of Saigon as the capital city of the Republic of (South) Vietnam grew. Following the First Indochina War, tens of thousands of refugees from the northern and central regions of Vietnam—a large portion of whom were Roman Catholics—resettled in Biên Hòa as part of Operation Passage to Freedom. During the Vietnam War, the United States Air Force operated Biên Hòa Air Base near the city. Mortar attacks on U.S. and ARVN targets were frequently staged from residential districts in Biên Hòa. Two of the better-known attacks took place during Tết of 1968 as well as 1969.

=== Socialist Republic ===
Because of its large population of former refugees and their descendants who fled North Vietnam's communist government in the mid-1950s, Biên Hòa was a center of resistance against the communist government in the months immediately following the fall of the Republic of Vietnam.

Like much of Vietnam, post-war Biên Hòa suffered a period of severe economic decline between 1975 and the second half of the 1980s. However, after the government of the Socialist Republic of Vietnam introduced Đổi Mới, a series of economic and political reforms in 1986, Biên Hòa experienced significant economic growth. The city and its surrounding areas attracted substantial foreign investment, leading to industrialization and development.

By 2005, Biên Hòa had become an industrial hub of southern Vietnam. Many factories and warehouses (often funded in collaboration with Japanese, Singaporean, American, Swiss and other foreign investors) operate in the areas surrounding the city.

With regard to entertainment, the city includes several amusement parks, nightclubs and restaurants lining the Đồng Nai River. Construction has increased rapidly, with many Western-style houses and villas under development. The real estate market has experienced a series of boom cycles since the mid-1990s.

Biên Hòa is home to Bình An Cemetery (also known as Biên Hòa Military Cemetery), a large national cemetery for fallen soldiers and military officials of the former Republic of Vietnam (ARVN). After the fall of Saigon, the cemetery was ransacked and subsequently abandoned. The Vietnamese American Foundation, also known as The Returning Casualty, is working to restore the cemetery and excavate a nearby mass grave of approximately 200 ARVN soldiers.

At the end of 2015, the Prime Minister of Vietnam issued Decision No.2488/QD-TTg recognizing Biên Hòa as a class-1 provincial city.

On September 28, 2024, the National Assembly Standing Committee issued Resolution No. 1194/NQ-UBTVQH15 on the arrangement of commune-level administrative units of Dong Nai province in the 2023–2025 period (the resolution took effect on November 1, 2024). Accordingly:

- Merged the entire Hòa Bình Ward and a part of Quarter 10 of Tân Phong Ward into Quang Vinh Ward.
- Merged Thanh Bình Ward, Quyết Thắng Ward, and the remaining part of Quarter 10 of Tân Phong Ward into Trung Dũng Ward.
- Merged Tân Tiến Ward into Tân Mai Ward.
- Merged Tam Hòa Ward into Bình Đa Ward.

== Economy ==
Biên Hòa is a key industrial hub in southern Vietnam. There are six industrial zones:

- Biên Hòa I Industrial Park. The country’s oldest industrial park, covering 340 hectares (840 acres), is set to be converted into an urban, commercial, and service area by the end of 2025.
- Biên Hòa II Industrial Zone, 365 ha (900 acres)
- Amata Industrial Park, 674 ha (1,670 acres). This is the first investment project of Amata Corporation in Vietnam.
- Long Bình Industrial Zone Development
- Agtex Long Bình Industrial Park - AGTEX 28, 43 ha (110 acres)
- Tam Phước Industrial Park, 323 ha

Sanyang Motor's Vietnam Manufacturing & Export Processing Co., Ltd. (VMEP) is located in Biên Hòa.

== Transport ==
- National Route 1 (Hanoi Highway), National Route 51, and National Route 1K pass through the city.
- Đồng Nai Bridge, Hóa An Bridge, Ghềnh Bridge leads out of the south of the city.
- Biên Hòa station on the North–South Railway also leads out of the city.
- Bien Hoa Air Base is one of the biggest air bases in Vietnam.
- Đồng Nai port is located on Đồng Nai river.
- Air travel is served by Ho Chi Minh City's Tân Sơn Nhất International Airport which is 32 km (20 mi) south of the city.

== Education ==
- Dong Nai University
- Lạc Hồng University
- Lương Thế Vinh High School for the Gifted
- Ngo Quyen High School

== Environment ==
Biên Hòa Air Base served as the main storage and handling site for Agent Orange during the Vietnam War and remains the largest dioxin hotspot in Vietnam. U.S. and Vietnamese authorities are working to clean up the affected areas.

== Notable landmarks ==
- Trấn Biên Literature Temple has been recognised as national historical relic. Ancient Citadel of Biên Hòa is the only ancient citadel in the Southern Vietnam that still exists today. Nguyễn Hữu Cảnh Temple worships Nguyễn Hữu Cảnh, the General had a huge contribution in the Nam tiến.
- Sonadezi Building - the first skyscraper in Biên Hòa city and Đồng Nai province
- The Mira Central Park Hotel - the highest hotel building in Biên Hòa
- The Pegasus Plaza - the highest twin building in Biên Hòa
- Universe Complex: Dynamic - the current highest building in Biên Hòa
- Đồng Nai Bridge
- Hóa An Bridge
- Ghềnh Bridge (1901-1904) - designed by company associated with Gustave Eiffel; 2 spans was collapsed in 2016 and new bridge was built months later in the same year
- Rạch Cát Bridge (1903) - outer spans designed by company associated with Gustave Eiffel; inner span added during Vietnam War

== Sister city ==
- Gimhae, Gyeongsangnam-do, South Korea
- Pakse, Champasak province, Laos
