= Trấn Biên =

Ward and capital of Đồng Nai city, Vietnam

Trấn Biên Phường Trấn Biên Bình Trước
- Ward
- Trấn Biên ward
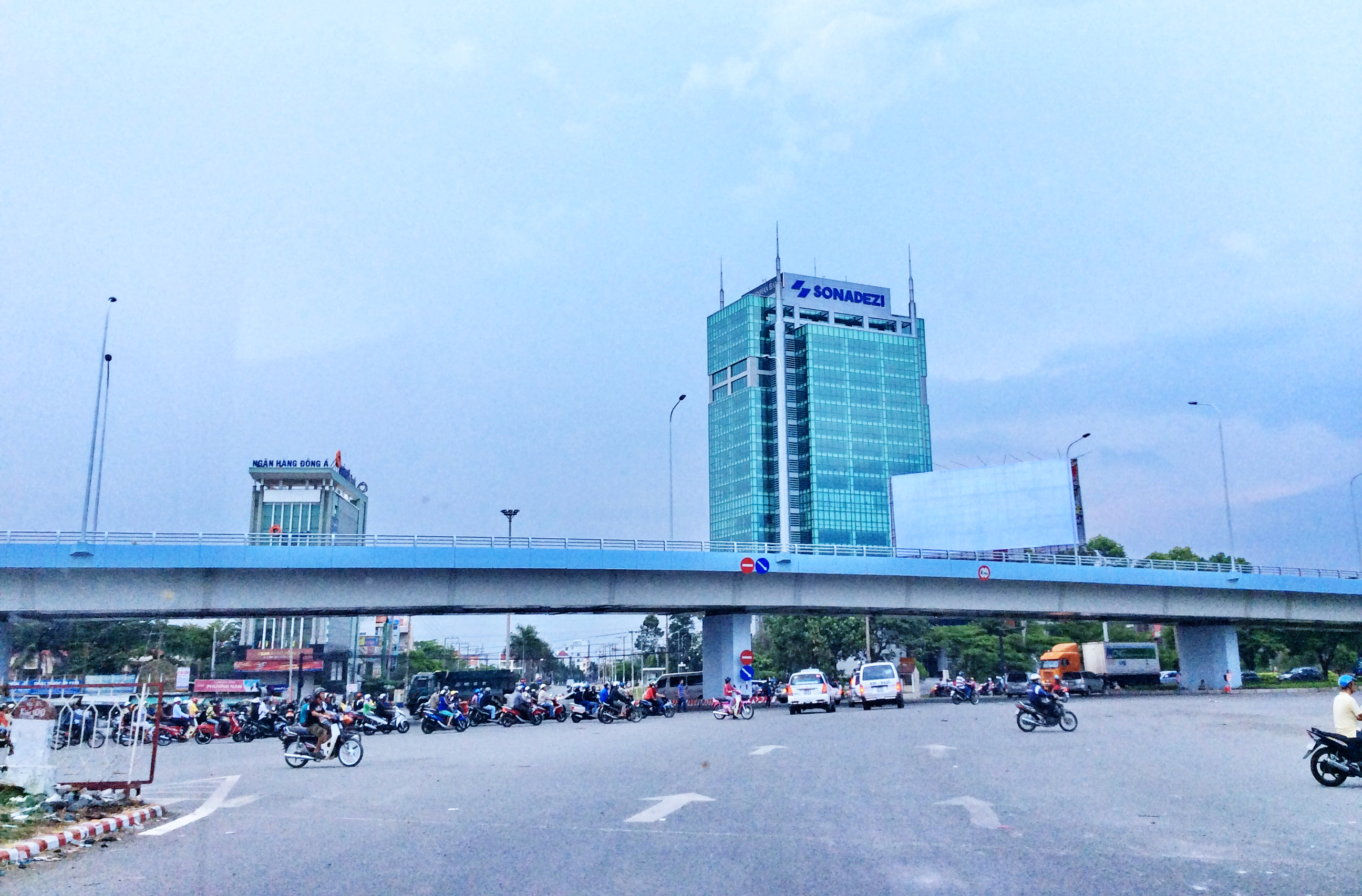
- Vũng Tàu intersection with Sonadezi Tower at the former Biên Hòa Industrial Park 1

- Location in Vietnam
- Coordinates: 10°57′13″N 106°49′20″E
- Country: Vietnam
- Municipality: Đồng Nai

Area
  - Total: 11.98 sq mi (31.03 km^{2})

Population (2025)
  - Total: 201,946
  - Density: 16,860/sq mi (6,508/km^{2})
- Time zone: UTC+7 (UTC+7)

Trấn Biên is a ward located in Đồng Nai, Vietnam. It has an area of about 31.03km² and the population in 2025 was 201,946 people. It is the de facto administrative centre and central business district of the City of Đồng Nai.

== Geography ==
Trấn Biên ward lies in the southwest of Đồng Nai municipality, on the east bank of Đồng Nai river, bordering the following wards:

- Long Bình and Tam Hiệp wards to the east.
- Biên Hòa ward and Đông Hòa, Tân Khánh, Ho Chi Minh City to the west by Đồng Nai River
- Long Hưng ward to the south
- Tân Triều ward to the north.

Trấn Biên ward has an area of 31.03 km², as of 2025, the population here is 201,946 people, with the people density is 6,508 people/km².

The Trấn Biên ward comprises most of the central urban core of the former Biên Hòa City.

== Etymology ==
From the early days of establishing governance in the newly settled southern region of Vietnam, the Đồng Nai area was considered the "frontier." In a situation of "vast land, sparse population," still harboring instability, the administrative name used by the Nguyen lords was Tran Bien garrison, Phước Long county. Trấn Biên here means a land to protect and safeguard the border, as there was also Phiên Trấn below, acting as a "protective barrier (phên dâu)". During the Tây Sơn dynasty, Trấn Biên was changed to Biên Trấn, an inversion that still has the same meaning. Trấn here was an administrative unit but with military characteristics (military administration).

Beside the name Trấn Biên, most of the ward area was known as Bình Trước, this place name was officially recognized since the 19th century and was an administrative division as a village then commune until 1976. The North Vietnam was recognized Bình Trước commune as Town of Biên Hòa (Thị xã Biên Hòa) during the First Indochina War time in 1948.

== History ==
=== Administrative history ===
Before 1984, the present-day Trấn Biên ward comprises several wards of Hòa Bình, Thanh Bình, Quyết Thắng, Quang Vinh, Trung Dũng, Thống Nhất and An Bình with communes of Bửu Long, Tân Thành và Hiệp Hòa of the City of Biên Hòa then.

On 17 January 1984, the Council of Ministers of Vietnam established Decision No. 12-HĐBT regarding the demarcation of boundaries for some communes, towns, and wards in Đồng Nai province, the two communes of Bửu Long and Tân Thành have been merged to form Tân Bửu commune.

On 29 August 1994, the Goverenment established the Decree No. 109-CP 1994 about reforming Vĩnh Cửu district; adjusting the boundaries of some communes and wards of the city of Biên Hòa and districts of Long Khánh, Long Thành, Nhơn Trạch, Tân Phú, Thống Nhất, Xuân Lộc, Đồng Nai province. Accordingly, Tân Bửu commune reformed into Bửu Long ward.

On 10 May 2019, the Standing Committee of the National Assembly of Vietnam established the Resolution 694/NQ-UBTVQH14 (effective from July 1, 2019). Accordingly, reformed Hiệp Hòa commune to the same name ward.

On 28 September 2024, the Standing Committee of the National Assembly of Vietnam established the Resolution No. 1194/NQ-UBTVQH15 regarding the reorganization of commune-level administrative units in Đồng Nai province for the period 2023-2025 (the resolution takes effect from 1 November 2024). Accordingly:

- The entire Hòa Bình ward and a portion of Quarter 10 of Tân Phong ward vào will be merged into Quang Vinh ward.
- Thanh Bình ward, Quyết Thắng ward and the remaining portion of Quarter 10 of Tân Phong ward will be merged into Trung Dũng ward.

On 16 June 2025, the Standing Committee of the National Assembly of Vietnam established Resolution No. 1662/NQ-UBTVQH15 regarding the reorganization of commune-level administrative units in Đồng Nai province in 2025. Accordingly, the entire natural area and population of Bửu Long, Quang Vinh, Trung Dũng, Thống Nhất, Hiệp Hòa and An Bình wards of the City of Biên Hòa then into a new administration called Trấn Biên ward (phường Trấn Biên).

On 17 April 2026, the Standing Committee of the National Assembly issued Resolution No. 237/NQ-UBTVQH on the rearrangement of commune-level administrative units in Đồng Nai province (the resolution takes effect from 30 April 2026). Accordingly, Trấn Biên is a ward of Municipality of Đồng Nai.

== Administrative divisions ==
As of July 2026, Trấn Biên ward is divide into 16 quarters: Bửu Long, Tân Thành, Bình Thành, Bình Thiền, Quang Vinh, Hoà Bình, Trung Dũng, Quyết Thắng, Bình Trước, Vinh Thạnh, Thống Nhất, Hiệp Hoà, Bình Đa, An Hảo, Bình An, An Bình.

== Notable places ==
- Trấn Biên Temple of Literature – A Cultural and Academic Icon: Located at the former area of Bửu Long, Trấn Biên Temple of Literature is one of the oldest historical relics in Đồng Nai province, first built in 1715 during the reign of Lord Nguyễn Phúc Chu. It was not only a center of education in the past but also a symbol of academic spirit, honoring Confucius, Vietnamese cultural figures, and talented individuals. It was recognized as a National Monument in 2016. Currently, the Temple of Literature also houses a shrine dedicated to President Ho Chi Minh, reflecting the tradition of "Respecting Teachers and Honoring Learning" (Tôn sư trọng đạo) and "Remembering the Source of One's Deeds" (Uống nước nhớ nguồn).
- Bửu Long Tourist Area: Often referred to as the "Hạ Long Bay on land (Vịnh Hạ Long trên cạn)", this tourist area stands out with its natural landscapes (mountains, lakes) and spiritual architectural structures such as Bửu Phong Pagoda and Long Ẩn Pagoda.
- Phố Island (Island City or Hiệp Hòa Island; Cù Lao Phố, Cù Lao Hiệp Hòa): Once a bustling trading port in the 17th century (formerly part of Hiep Hoa ward), this area still preserves important historical relics such as Ong Pagoda and the Nguyen Huu Canh Temple.
- Community and festivals: Trấn Biên Ward is also a hub for unique cultural festivals such as the Ong Pagoda Festival and folk religious activities, fostering cultural exchange and community cohesion. Its diverse ethnic and religious communities (Buddhism, Catholicism, Protestantism) highlight the ward's cultural unity.

== Transportation ==
=== Railways ===
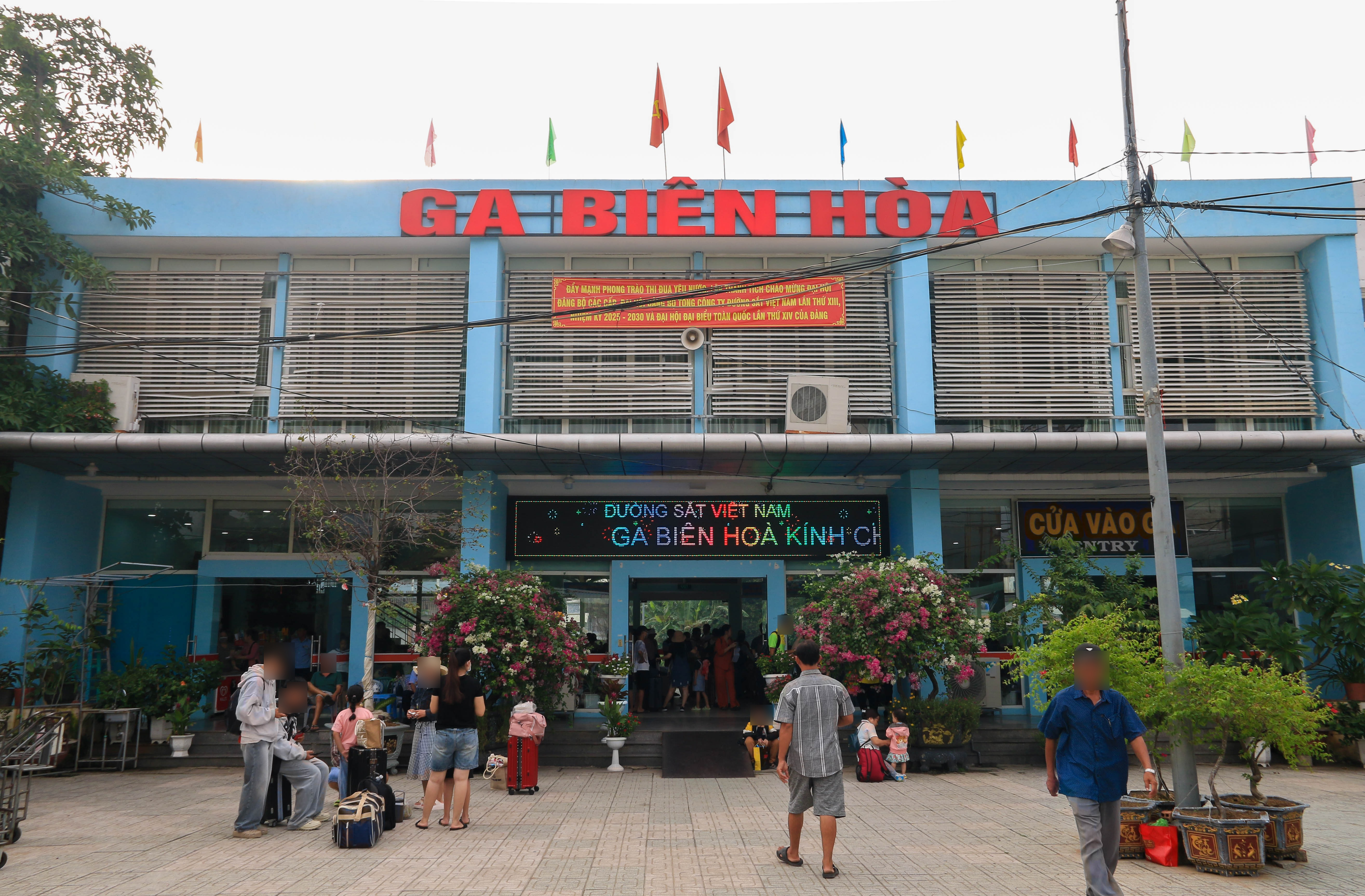
Biên Hòa Station

- Biên Hòa station, a stop of North–South railway, located in Trấn Biên ward.

=== MRT ===
- Extended Bến Thành – Suối Tiên Line (proposed)

=== Roads ===
Some main roads run through the war

- Hanoi Highway
- Nguyễn Ái Quốc Boulevard (National Route 1K
- Biên Hòa Ring Road

== Gallery ==
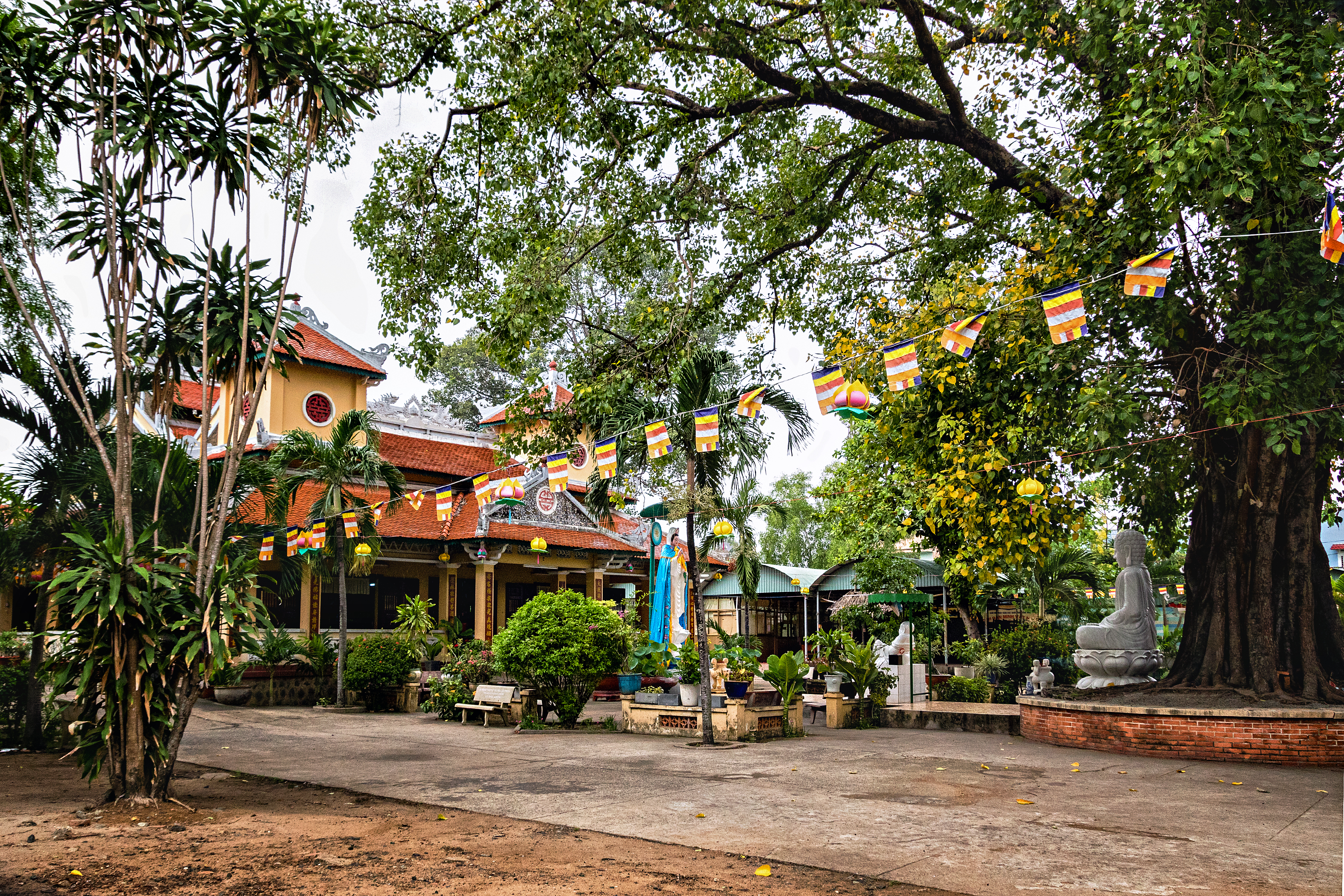
Đại Giác Pagoda

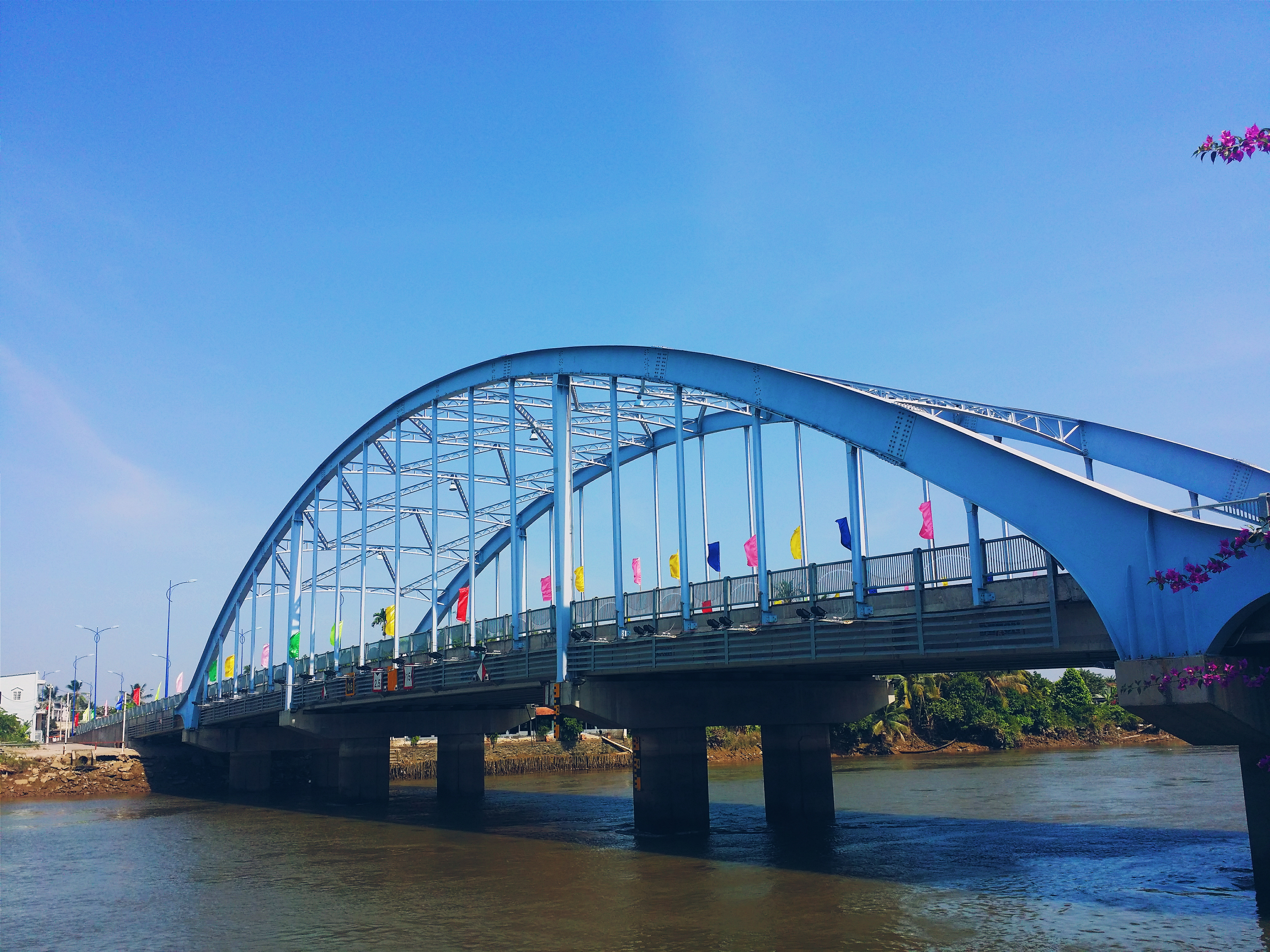
Hiệp Hòa Bridge crosses Cái River, a distributary of Đồng Nai River winding along the Hiệp Hòa Island

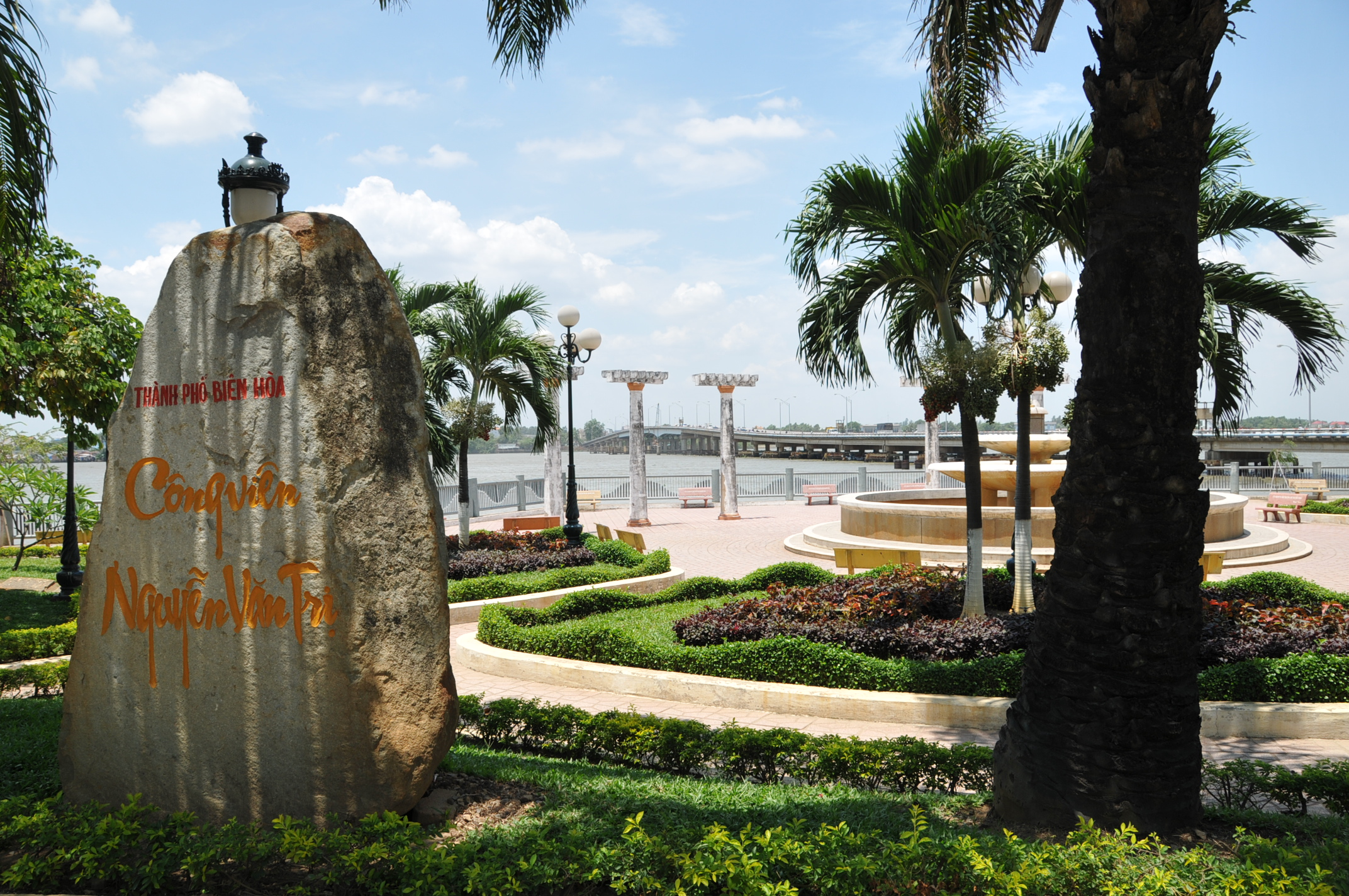
Nguyễn Văn Trị Riverside Park

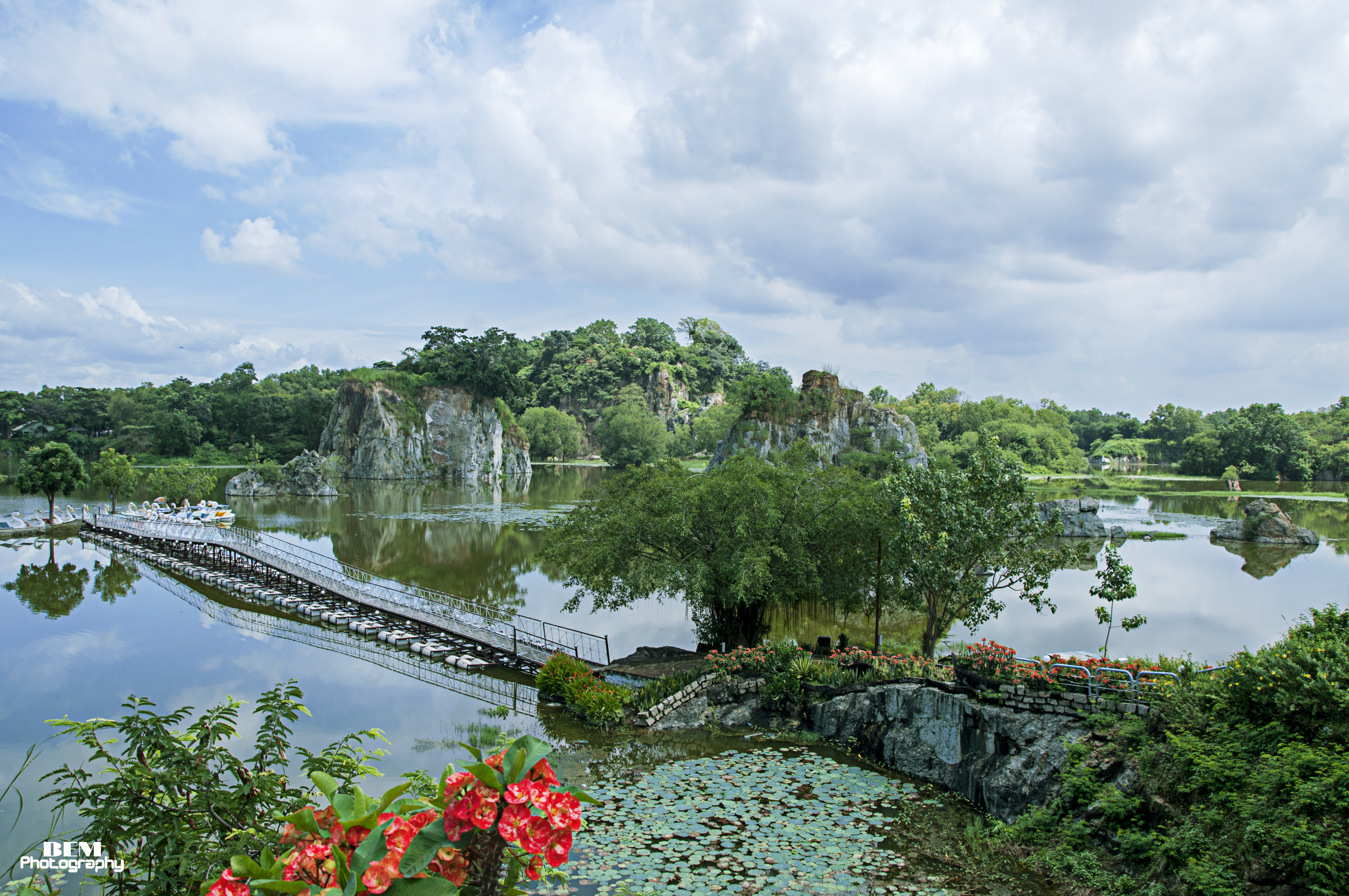
Inside Bửu Long Tourist Area
