= Long Hưng =

Long Hưng may refer to several commune-level subdivisions in Vietnam:

- Long Hưng, Cần Thơ, commune in Cần Thơ
- Long Hưng, Châu Thành, commune in Châu Thành district, Tiền Giang province
- Long Hưng, Đồng Nai, ward in Đồng Nai
- Long Hưng, Đồng Tháp, commune in Đồng Tháp province
- Long Hưng, Gò Công, ward in Gò Công, Tiền Giang province
- Long Hưng, Hưng Yên, commune in Hưng Yên province
- Long Hưng, Lấp Vòv, commune in the Lấp Vò district, Đồng Tháp province
- Long Hưng, Mỹ Tú, commune in Mỹ Tú district, Sóc Trăng province
- Long Hưng, Ô Môn, ward in Ô Môn district, Cần Thơ
- Long Hưng, Phú Riềng, commune in Phú Riềng district, Bình Phước province
- Long Hưng, Văn Giang, commune in Văn Giang district, Hưng Yên province
