= National University station =

National University station may refer to:

- National University station (Hanoi)
- National University station (Ho Chi Minh City)
