= Dong Nai =

Dong Nai (written Đồng Nai in Vietnamese) may refer to

- Đồng Nai, formerly Đồng Nai province, a city in Vietnam
- Đồng Nai river
- Đồng Nai, Lâm Đồng
- Đồng Nai, Bình Phước
- Đồng Nai Bridge
- Đồng Nai (newspaper)
