= Citadel of Biên Hòa =

Coordinates: 10°57′03″N 106°49′01″E

Map

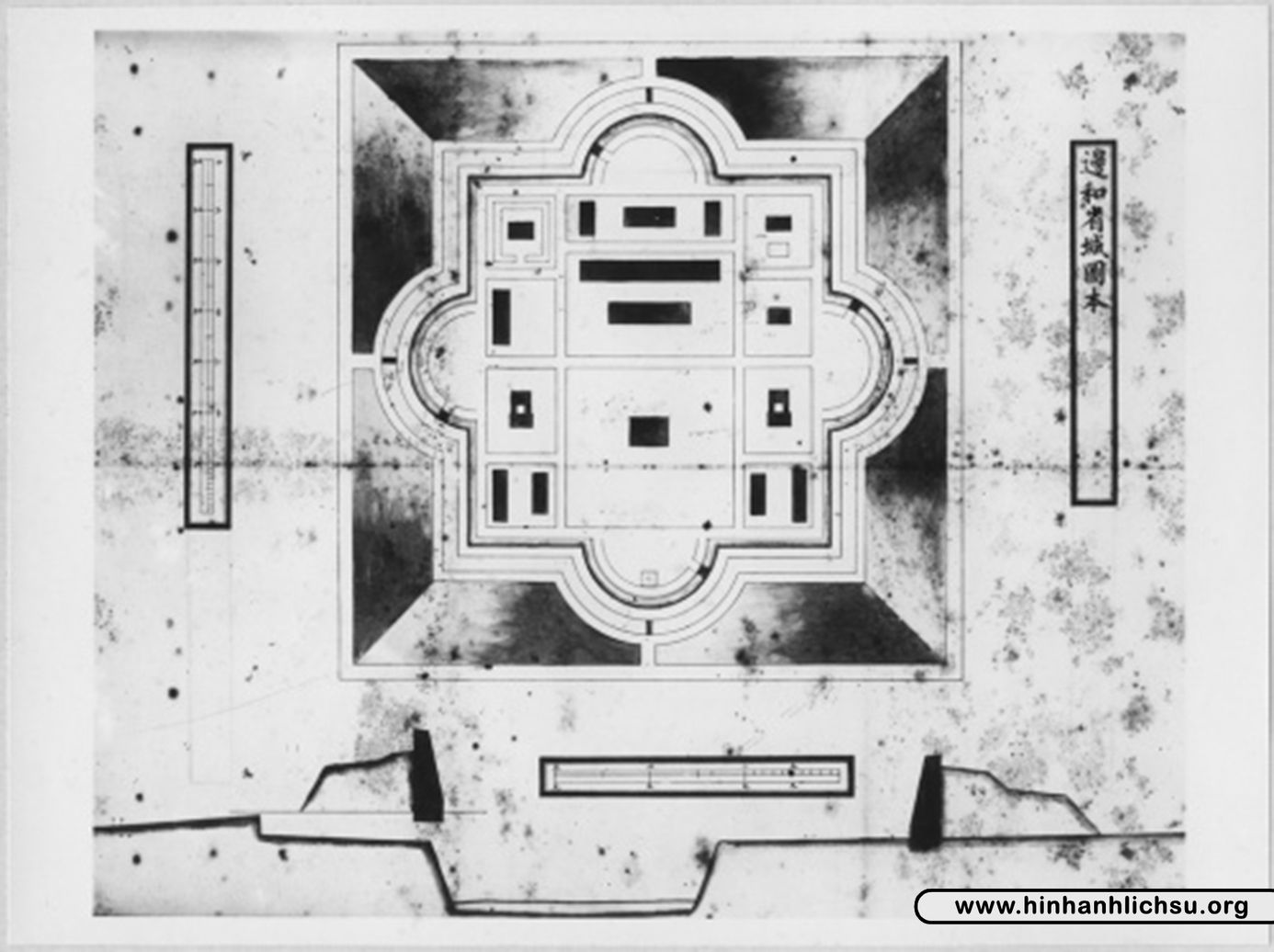
The drawing of Biên Hòa citadel

Citadel of Biên Hòa (Vietnamese: Thành cổ Biên Hòa) is a historic site located in Quang Vinh ward, Biên Hòa, Đồng Nai. It is considered the only ancient citadel in the Southern Vietnam that still exists today.

The remains of the old citadel is a laterite wall surrounding a 10,816.5 m2 wide campus. Inside the citadel, there is a French architecture manson.

== History ==
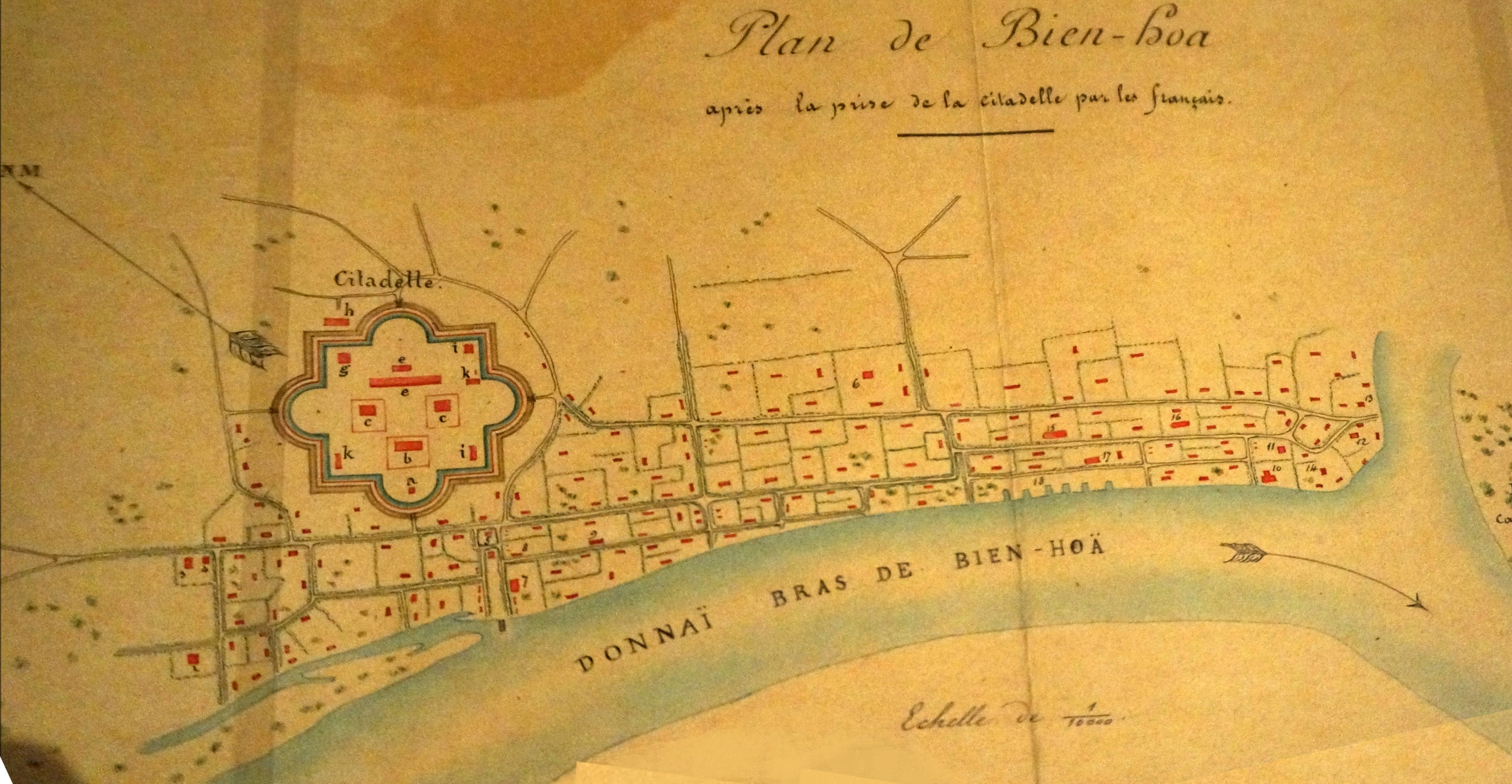
Map of the area around the citadel during 1856-1956

The land of former Biên Hòa had had an older citadel built by the Chenla people. In 1834, Emperor Minh Mang ordered to rebuild that citadel with clay and called it Thành Cựu (meaning 'Old Citadel' in English). By 1837, it was upgraded to laterite citadel and renamed Thành Biên Hòa. At that time, it was the second largest citadel in the Southern Vietnam, only after Gia Định citadel.

After the French colonialists invaded Vietnam, they shrunk the citadel to get land for other constructions. The citadel itself was used as a luxury barracks by the French army. Therefore, it was also called Thành Soldat . Soldat is a French word, means soldier. And because the soldiers used to blow the trumpet (Vietnamese: Kèn) to sound the alarm, the locals called it Thành Kèn.

After the Liberation of the South in 1975, the citadel is managed by current Đồng Nai Provincial Government.

== Conservation ==
After many years of war, the citadel was seriously degraded. The Vietnamese government has made many efforts to repair and restore it.

In 2013, it was recognized as a national historical relic.
