= Dong Nai University =

Public university in Đồng Nai Province, Vietnam

- Trường Đại học Đồng Nai
- Type: Public university
- Established: 1976
- Rector: Le Anh Duc
- Location: No. 9, Lê Quý Đôn Street, Quarter 3, Tân Hiệp Ward, Biên Hòa City, Đồng Nai Province, Vietnam; 10.9595°N 106.8614°E
- Campus: Urban
- Website: www.dnpu.edu.vn

Dong Nai University (DNU) is a public university located in Biên Hòa, Đồng Nai Province, Vietnam (Vietnamese: Trường Đại học Đồng Nai). Dong Nai University is directly under the People's Committee of Dong Nai province and is supervised by the Ministry of Education and Training. The university provides undergraduate education for the domestic students as well as the international students from neighboring countries such as Laos and Cambodia.

== History ==
- The predecessor of the Dong Nai University was Dong Nai Secondary School of Education - separated from College of Education Ho Chi Minh City - established on November 3, 1976, according to Decision No. 2317/QD of the Minister of Education.
- On March 28, 1987, the Prime Minister decided to upgrade the school to Dong Nai College of Education that is under the Department of Education and Training.
- On September 15, 1997, the Chairman of Dong Nai Province People’s Committee decided to merge the 2 provincial schools of education - Pedagogical High School and Dong Nai College of Education.
- On August 20, 2010, the Prime Minister decided to establish Dong Nai University on the basis of upgrading Dongnai College of Education.

== Certificate of Appreciation ==
- First Class Labor Medal (2011)
- Second Class Labor Medal (2001)
- Third Class Labor Medal (1996)

== Partner universities ==
- (South Korea) Silla University
- (United States) California State University, Fullerton
- (United States) University of Oklahoma

== Notable alumni ==
- Huỳnh Nguyễn Mai Phương - Top 5 finalist at Miss Vietnam 2020, Miss World Vietnam 2022, Top 40 Miss Word 2023 (Winner of Multimedia Challenge)

== Related news ==
- Dong Nai University and Vietcombank (Dong Nai branch) signed a comprehensive cooperation agreement
