= Binh Thai station =

Metro station in Ho Chi Minh City, Vietnam

L1 10 Binh Thai Bình Thái

General information
- Location: Trường Thọ Ward, Thủ Đức, Ho Chi Minh City, Vietnam
- Coordinates: 10.8325°N 106.76389°E
- System: Ho Chi Minh City Metro station
- Line: L1

Construction
- Structure type: Elevated

Other information
- Status: Completed

History
- Opened: 22 December 2024

Services
Preceding station	Ho Chi Minh City Metro	Following station
Phuoc Long L1 09 towards Ben Thanh	Line 1	Thu Duc L1 11 towards Suoi Tien Terminal
Route map
Location

Binh Thai station (Vietnamese: Ga Bình Thái) is an elevated Ho Chi Minh City Metro station on Line 1. Located in Trường Thọ Ward, Thủ Đức, Ho Chi Minh City, the station opened on 22 December 2024.

The station was named after an old village then a hamlet around it, now it is used to call the intersection of Hanoi Highway and the Ring Road 2 of the city run through it.

== Station layout ==
2F; Platform	Side platform, doors will open on the right
2F; Platform	Platform 1	← L1 Line 1 to Phuoc Long (for Ben Thanh)
2F; Platform	Platform 2	L1 Line 1 to Thu Duc (for Suoi Tien Terminal) →
2F; Platform	Side platform, doors will open on the right
1F	1st Floor	Ticket sales area, commercial area, technical department area, platform gates & ticket gates
GF	Ground Floor	Entrances/Exits and technical department area
