= Suối Tiên Theme Park =

Amusement park in Ho Chi Minh city, Vietnam

Coordinates: 10.863885°N 106.802173°E

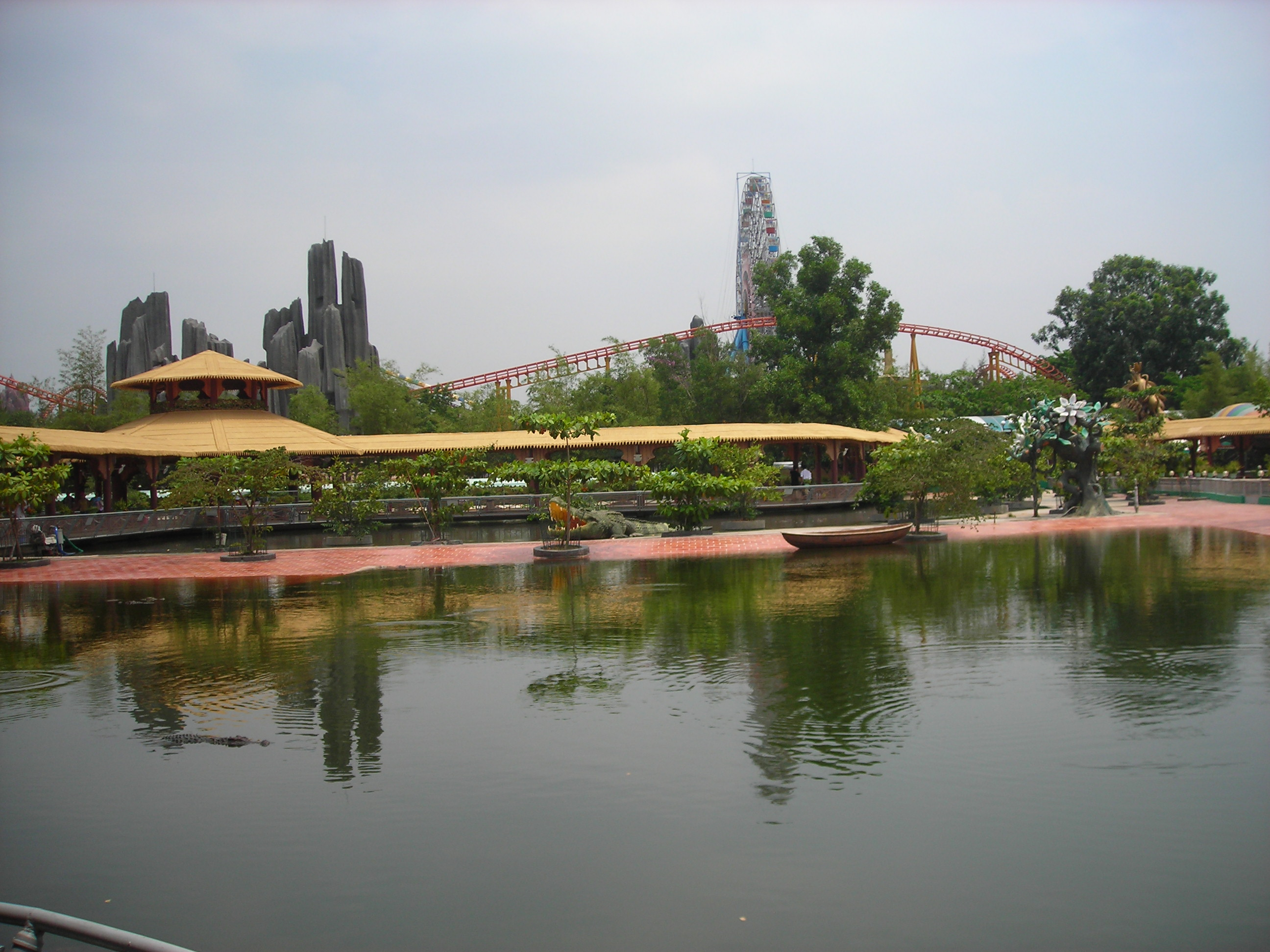
Crocodile Kingdom in Suối Tiên Park, the roller coaster and the Big Wheel can be seen above

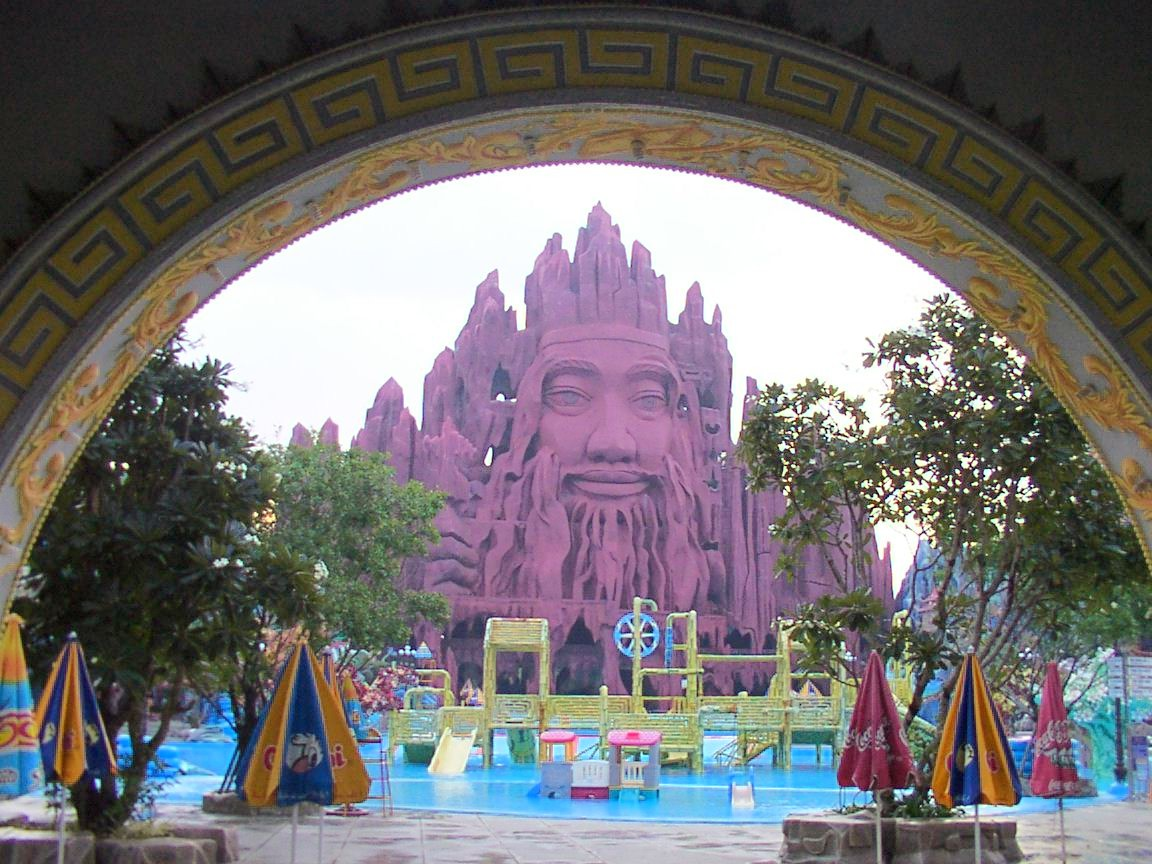
The Tiên Dong Beach in Suối Tiên Park, Hồ Chí Minh City

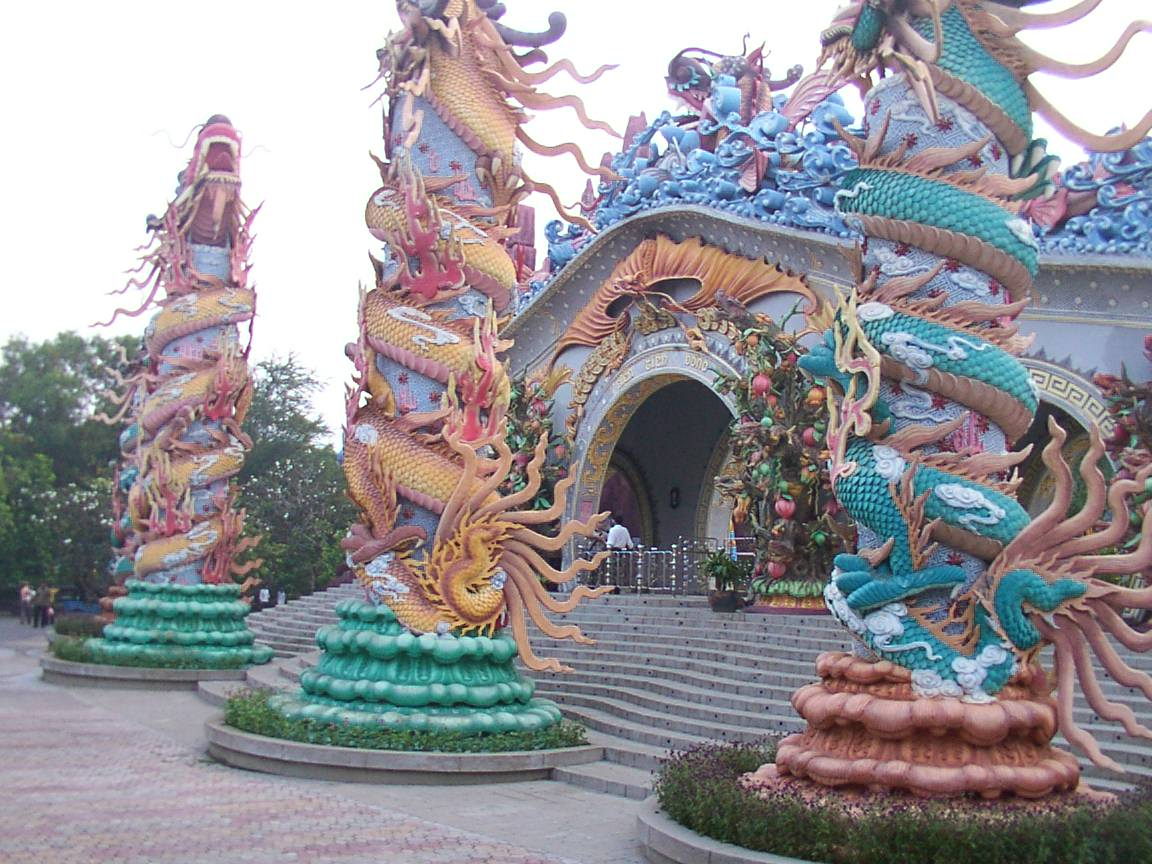
The entrance to Tiên Dong Beach in the Suối Tiên Park, Hồ Chí Minh City

Suối Tiên Theme Park is an amusement park in Tăng Nhơn Phú, Ho Chi Minh City, Vietnam. The park includes several entertainment areas. The landscaping and attractions in the park illustrate Vietnam's history and legends, such as Âu Cơ and Lạc Long Quân as well as the Battle of Son Tinh and Thuy Tinh (The Mountain God and The River God). An artificial seawater pool is located in the park for sea-bathers. There is also a dinosaur garden and a roller coaster called "Roller Coaster".

Location of Suối Tiên Theme Park in Ho Chi Minh City

The Tiên Dong beach is a man-made beach featuring a large waterfall with the face of an emperor sculpted into it. The park is colorful, and you will find giant sculpted dragons painted in blue and orange pastels, soft red Buddha statues and lush green gardens, as well as all the normal theme park attractions; the park also has a zoo.

The park opened in 1995. The park is served by National University Station on the first line of the Ho Chi Minh City Metro.
