= Trấn Biên Temple of Literature =

Confucian temple in Biên Hòa, Vietnam

Văn Miếu Trấn Biên
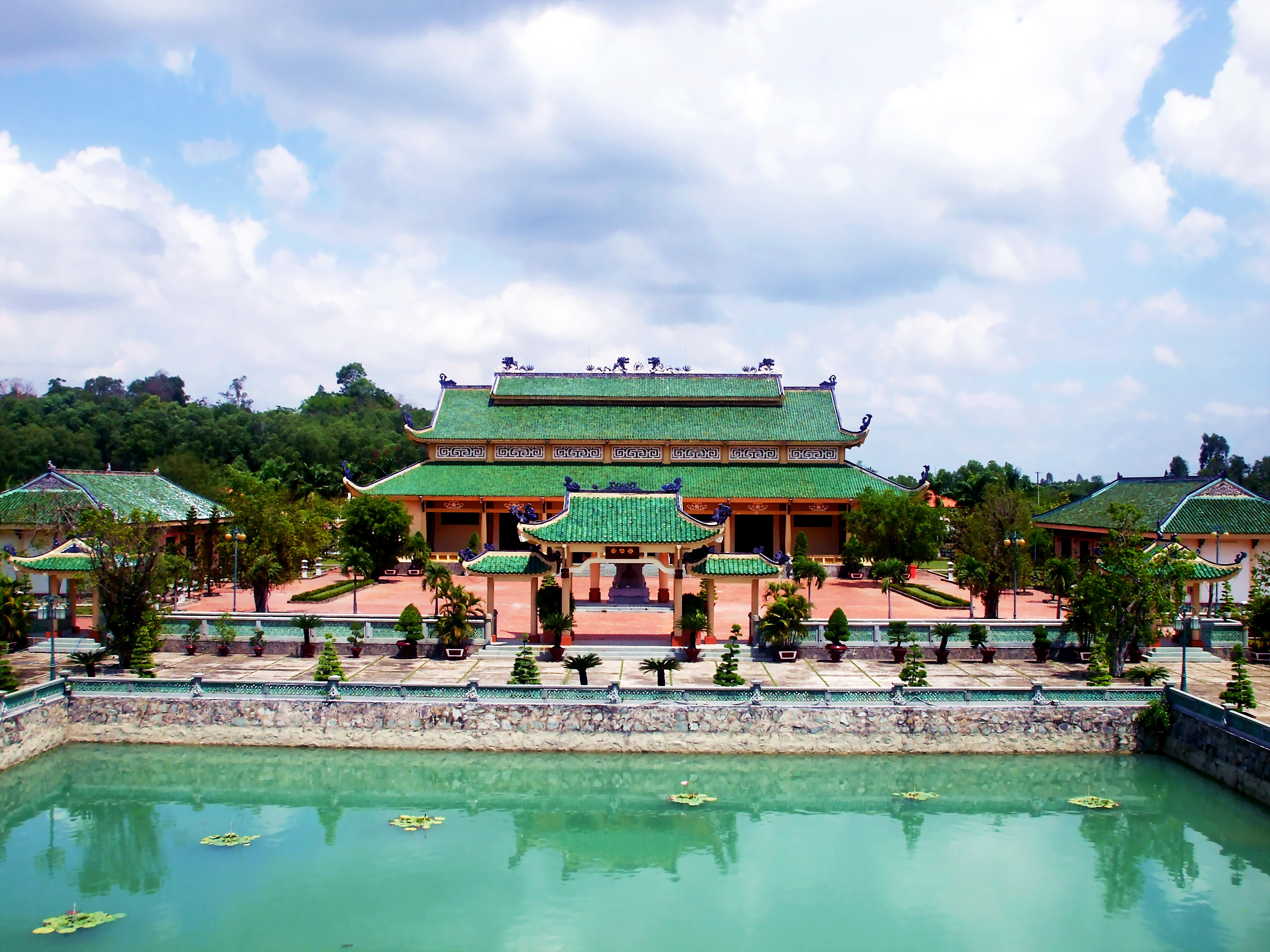
- A full view of the Văn Miếu Trấn Biên

Religion
- Affiliation: Confucianism

Location
- Location: Trấn Biên, Vietnam
- Municipality: Đồng Nai
- Interactive map of Văn Miếu Trấn Biên
- Coordinates: 10.9648°N 106.8015°E

Architecture
- Completed: 2002

Trấn Biên Temple of Literature (Văn Miếu Trấn Biên) is a Confucian temple located in Trấn Biên Ward, Vietnam, the capital city of the Đồng Nai Province. The temple was first built in 1715 in the area of Đàng Trong. The Văn Miếu Trấn Biên was soon demolished by the French colonial administration in 1861, and was later restored to its original condition in 2002.

== History ==
=== Establishment ===
In 1715, Nguyễn Phúc Chu, a Vietnamese warlord, sent a request to Governor Nguyễn Phan Long and Phạm Khánh Đức to build the Văn Miếu Trấn Biên to have a place to promote, preserve, and honor Confucian cultural values. The temple was first built in southern Vietnam, before other temples were built in Vĩnh Long, Gia Định, and Huế. Similar to the Văn Miếu in Huế and the Văn Miếu in Hanoi, the temple's purpose is to teach young students, and was built near many Biên Hòa provincial schools. Thus, in addition to a place of worship, the Văn Miếu Trấn Biên serves as a place of culture and education.

=== Restoration ===
The Văn Miếu Trấn Biên has undergone many restoration projects, being rebuilt twice during the Nguyễn dynasty, and then restored again in 1998 after the French destroyed the historical site. The first "phase" of the 1998 restoration project began during Tet 2002, while the second phase is still under construction.

Another restoration project of the Văn Miếu Trấn Biên was launched to rebuild an ancient Confucius temple based in Bửu Long Ward, District, Biên Hoa, Đồng Nai province, with an investment of nearly VND 20 billion. The project was started on February 14, 2002, in celebration of 300 years of the Văn Miếu Trấn Biên.

In 2016, it has been recognised as national historical relic.
