= Biên Hòa station =

Railway station in Biên Hòa, Vietnam

Bien Hoa Ga Biên Hòa
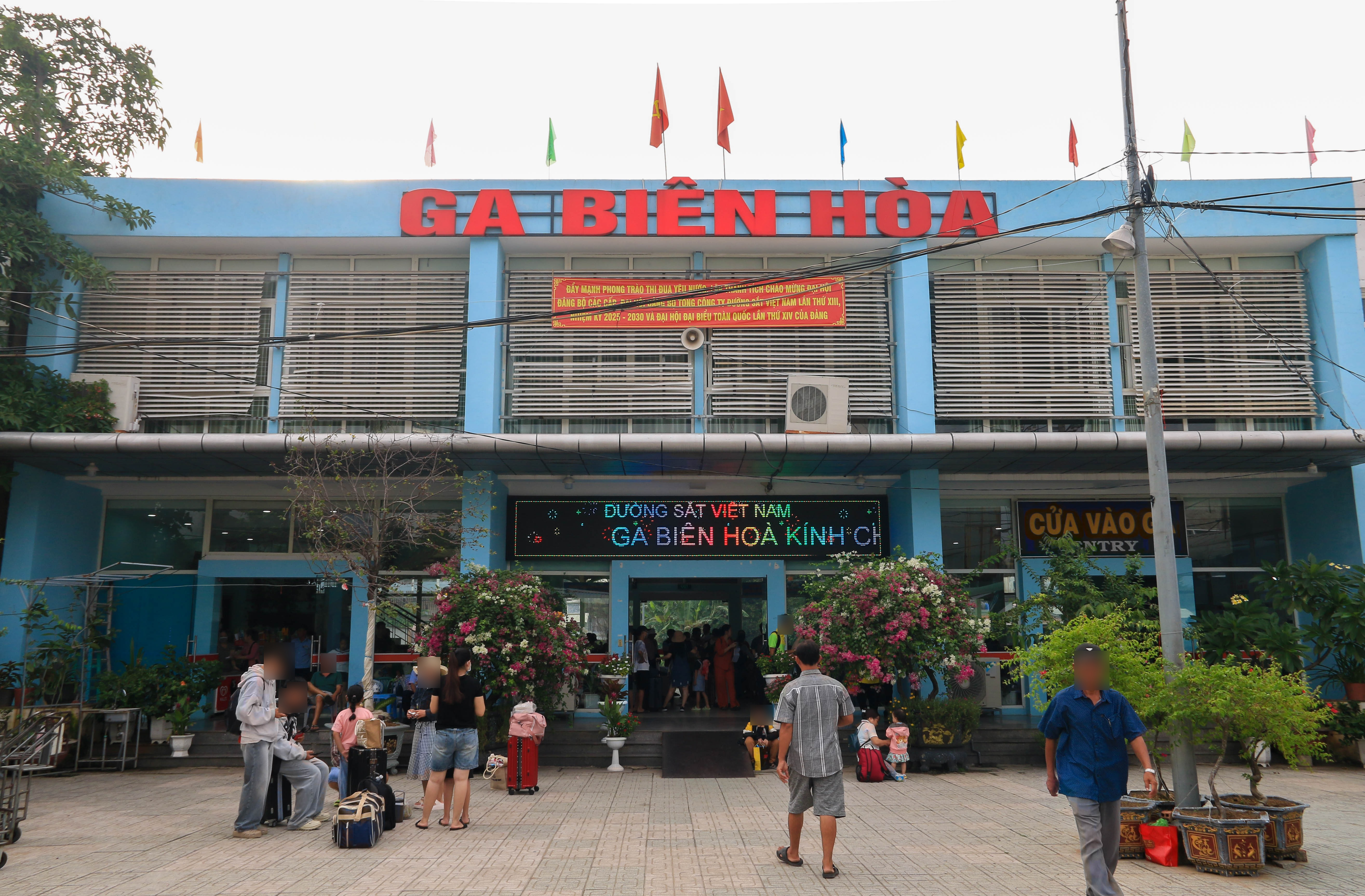
- Bien Hoa Station in 2025

General information
- Location: Biên Hòa, Đồng Nai Province; Vietnam
- Coordinates: 10°57′03″N 106°49′35″E
- Line: North–South Railway

Services
| Preceding station | Vietnam Railways | Following station |
|---|---|---|
| Hố Nai towards Hanoi | North–South | Dĩ An towards Saigon |
Location

Biên Hòa station is a railway station on the North–South railway (Reunification Express) in Vietnam. It serves the town of Biên Hòa, in Đồng Nai Province.

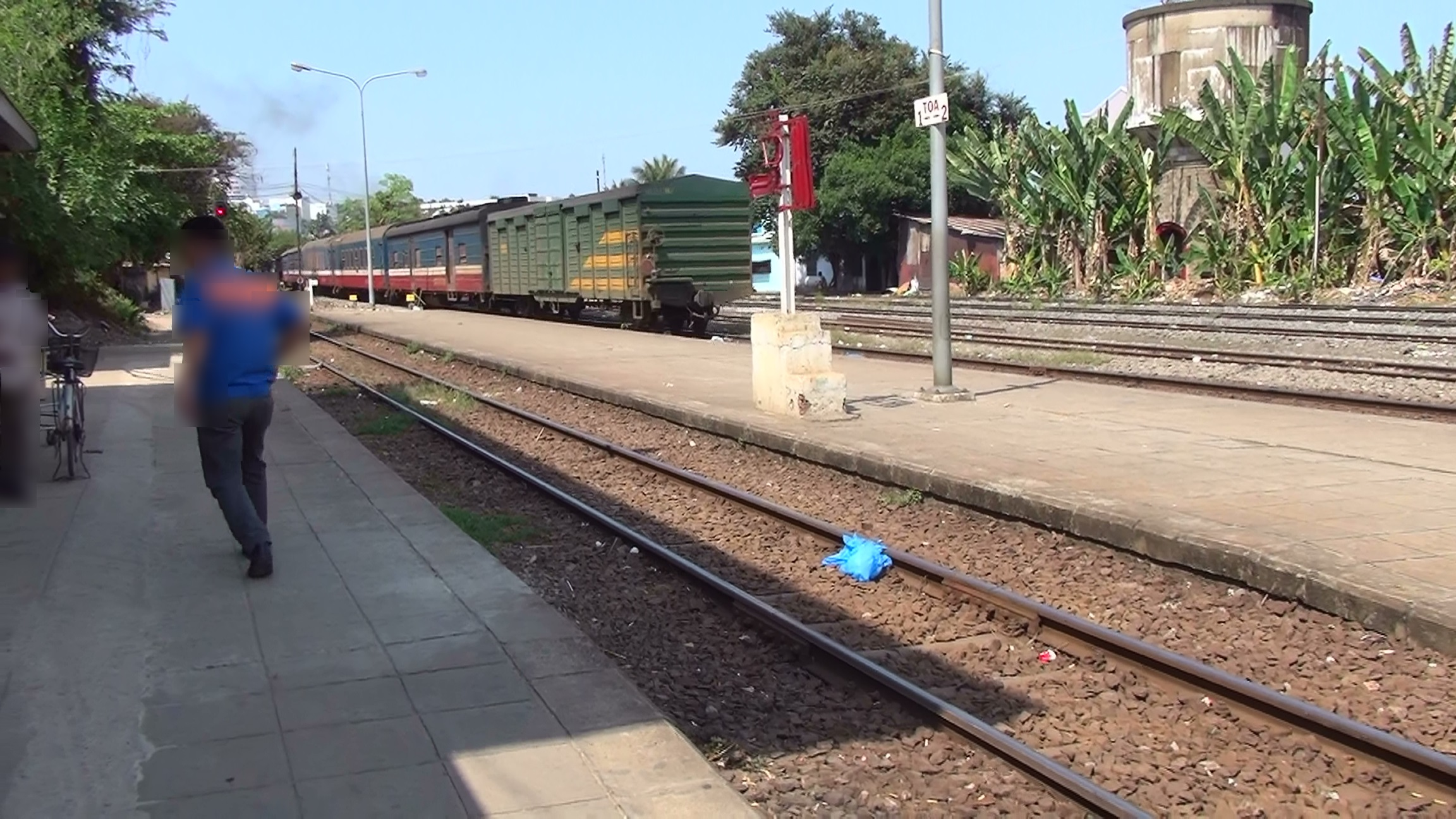
The local service train leaving Bien Hoa station for Hanoi, photographed in 2014.
