= Phuoc Long station =

Metro station in Ho Chi Minh city

Coordinates: 10°49′17″N 106°45′29″E

L1 09 Phuoc Long Phước Long
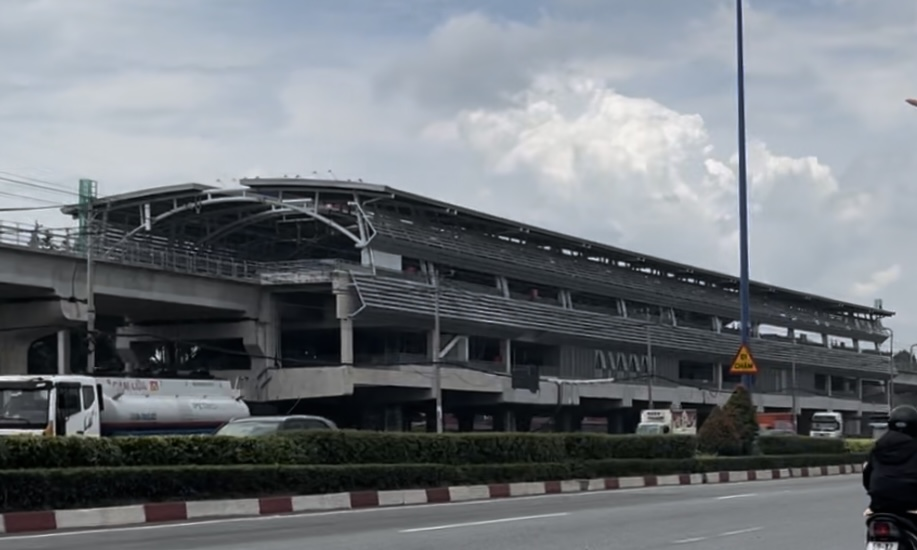

General information
- Location: Trường Thọ Ward, Thủ Đức, Ho Chi Minh City, Vietnam
- System: Ho Chi Minh City Metro station
- Line: L1

Construction
- Structure type: Elevated

Other information
- Status: Completed

History
- Opened: 22 December 2024

Services
Preceding station	Ho Chi Minh City Metro	Following station
Rach Chiec L1 08 towards Ben Thanh	Line 1	Binh Thai L1 10 towards Suoi Tien Terminal
Route map
Location

Phuoc Long station (Vietnamese: Ga Phước Long) is an elevated Ho Chi Minh City Metro station on Line 1. Located between the ICD Ports of Trường Thọ and Phước Long (both were planned for renovated for urban planning), in Trường Thọ Ward, Thủ Đức, Ho Chi Minh City, the station opened on 22 December 2024.

== Station layout ==
2F; Platform	Side platform, doors will open on the right
2F; Platform	Platform 1	← L1 Line 1 to Rach Chiec (for Ben Thanh)
2F; Platform	Platform 2	L1 Line 1 to Binh Thai (for Suoi Tien Terminal) →
2F; Platform	Side platform, doors will open on the right
1F	1st Floor	Ticket sales area, commercial area, technical department area, platform gates & ticket gates
GF	Ground Floor	Entrances/Exits and technical department area
