= National University station (Ho Chi Minh City) =

Metro station in Ho Chi Minh City, Vietnam

L1 13 National University Đại học Quốc Gia
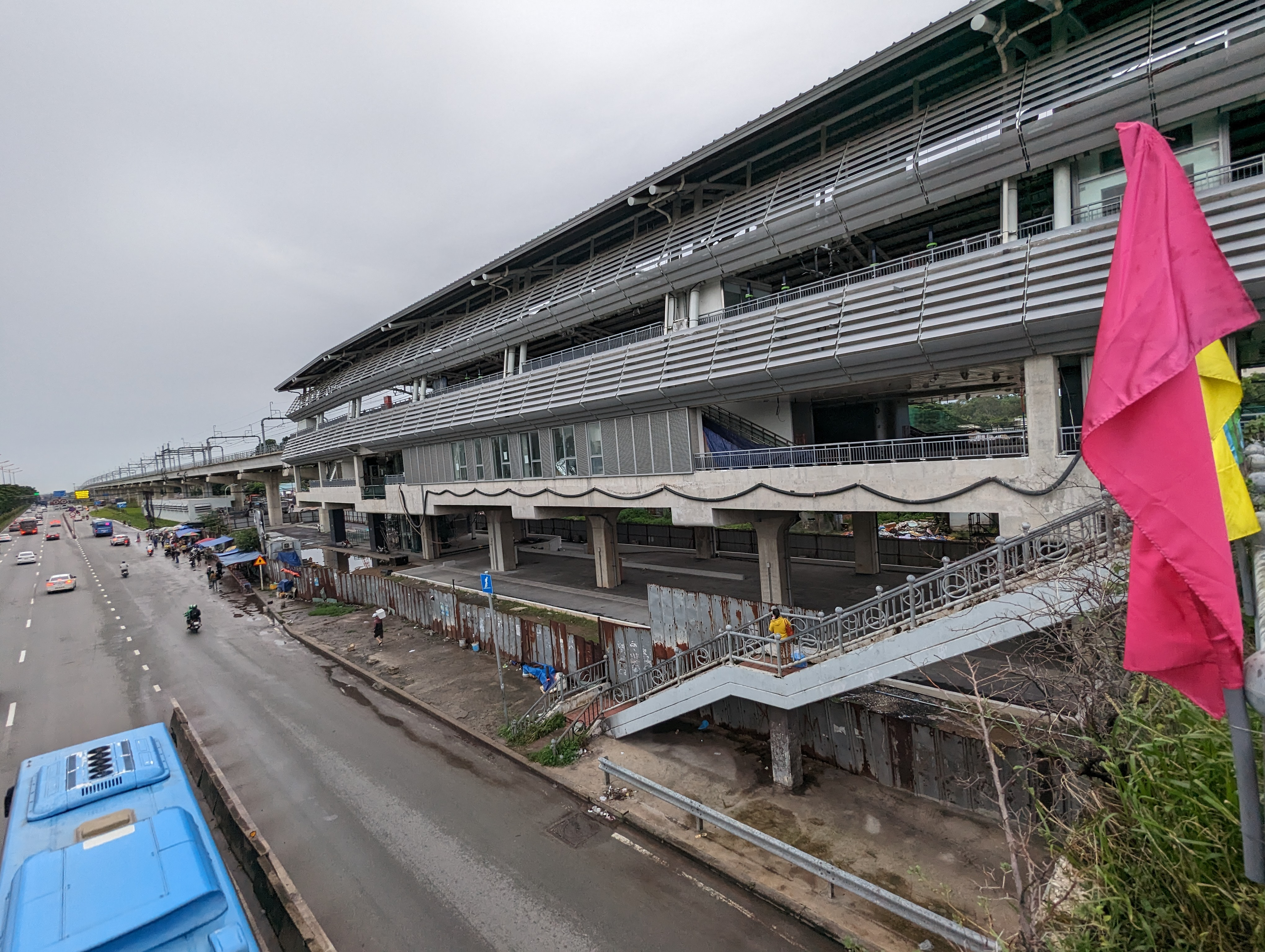

General information
- Other names: Suối Tiên
- Location: Hà Nội Highway, Linh Trung, Thủ Đức, Ho Chi Minh City, Vietnam
- Coordinates: 10°51′59″N 106°48′4″E
- System: Ho Chi Minh City Metro station
- Line: L1

Construction
- Structure type: Elevated

Other information
- Status: Completed

History
- Opened: 22 December 2024

Services
Preceding station	Ho Chi Minh City Metro	Following station
High Tech Park L1 12 towards Ben Thanh	Line 1	Suoi Tien Terminal L1 14 Terminus
Route map
Location

National University station (Vietnamese: Ga Đại học Quốc Gia) is an elevated Ho Chi Minh City Metro station on Line 1. Located between Suoi Tien Amusement Park and VNU-HCM in Thủ Đức City, the station opened on 22 December 2024.

== Station layout ==
2F; Platform	Side platform, doors will open on the right
2F; Platform	Platform 1	← L1 Line 1 to High Tech Park (for Ben Thanh)
2F; Platform	Platform 2	L1 Line 1 to Suoi Tien Terminal (Terminus) →
2F; Platform	Side platform, doors will open on the right
1F	1st Floor	Ticket sales area, commercial area, technical department area, platform gates & ticket gates
GF	Ground Floor	Entrances/Exits and technical department area
