= Tam Hiệp =

- Ward
- Dong Nai Television Tower seen from above
- Interactive map of Tam Hiệp
- Coordinates: 10.93849678537252°N 106.86048807754834°E
- Country: Vietnam
- Region: Southeast Vietnam
- City: Đồng Nai
- Established: 16 June 2025

Area
  - Total: 10.81 km^{2} (4.17 sq mi)

Population (31 December 2025)
  - Total: 152,515
  - Density: 14,103/km^{2} (36,530/sq mi)
- Postal code: 76109
- Website: https://tamhiep.dongnai.gov.vn

Tam Hiệp is a ward located in Đồng Nai, Vietnam. It has an area of about 10.81 square kilometres (4.17 sq mi) and the population in 2025 was 152.515.

On 16 June 2025, the Standing Committee of the National Assembly issued Resolution No. 1662/NQ-UBTVQH15 on the reorganization of commune-level administrative divisions in Đồng Nai province in 2025. Accordingly, the entire natural area and population of the former wards of Tân Hiệp, Tân Mai, Bình Đa, and Tam Hiệp, which were previously part of Biên Hòa city, were merged to form a new ward named Tam Hiệp (Clause 70, Article 1).

On 24 April 2026, the National Assembly issued Resolution No. 30/2026/QH16 establishing Đồng Nai city as a centrally governed city, comprising the entire natural area and population of Đồng Nai province. The resolution took effect on 30 April 2026. Since then, Tam Hiệp ward has been part of Đồng Nai city.
