= Tân Triều =

- Ward
- Location in Vietnam
- Coordinates: 10°58′13″N 106°50′39″E
- Country: Vietnam
- Municipality: Đồng Nai

Area
  - Total: 6.5 sq mi (16.8 km^{2})

Population (2018)
  - Total: 42,031
- Time zone: UTC+7 (UTC+7)

Tân Triều is a ward located in Đồng Nai, Vietnam. It has an area of about 16.8km^{2} and the population in 2018 was 42,031.

Biên Hòa Airbase and Đồng Nai province Square located in Tân Triều ward.
