= Đồng Nai Bridge =

Bridge in Vietnam

Coordinates: 10°54′04″N 106°50′22″E

Đồng Nai Bridge (Vietnamese: Cầu Đồng Nai) is an important road bridge across the Đồng Nai River towards the south of the city of Biên Hòa in Vietnam. It is located along National Highway 1A, and crosses the river, connecting Bình Dương Province to Đồng Nai Province. The bridge has a length of 453.9 metres (1,489 ft), and has 4 lanes, with a curb for pedestrians sides 3.6 metres (12 ft) wide.

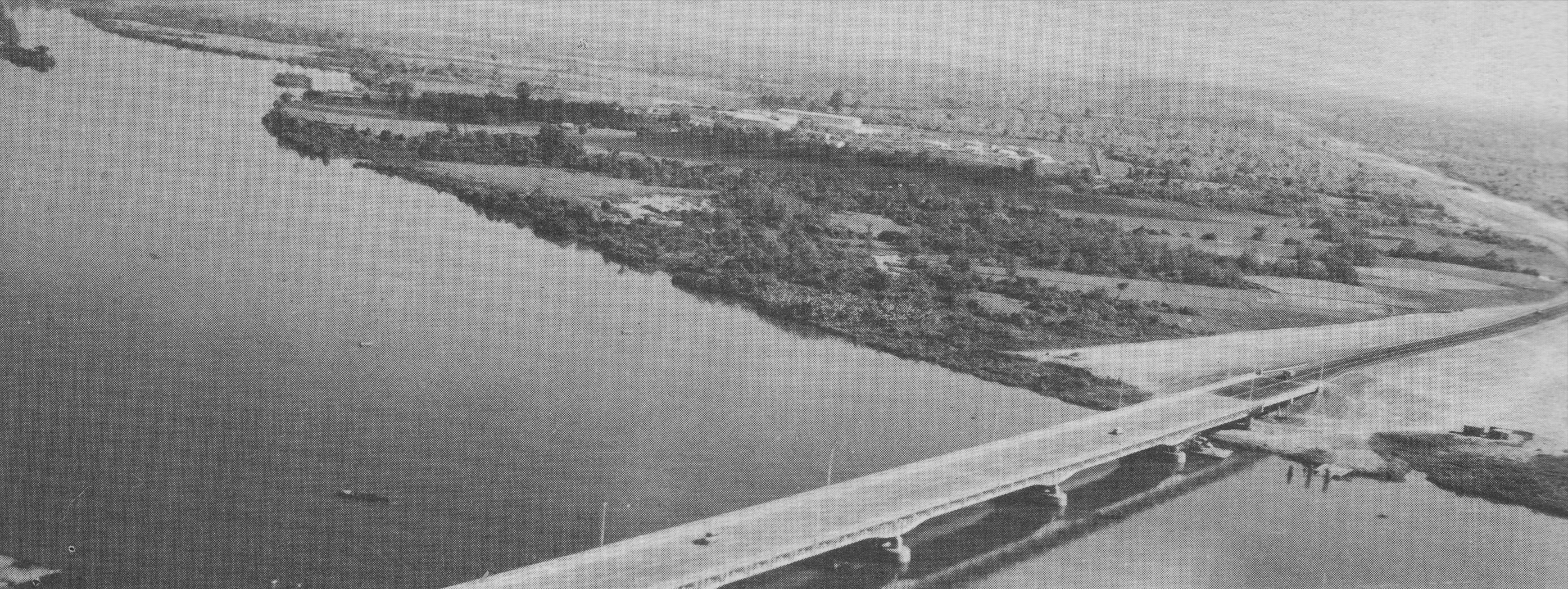

The bridge was constructed in 1964, where QL 1 crosses the Đồng Nai River, and shows of degradation; more than 44,000 vehicles pass over it per day. In 2009, a parallel span opened to relieve traffic on the original.
