= Long Bình, Đồng Nai =

Long Bình
- Ward
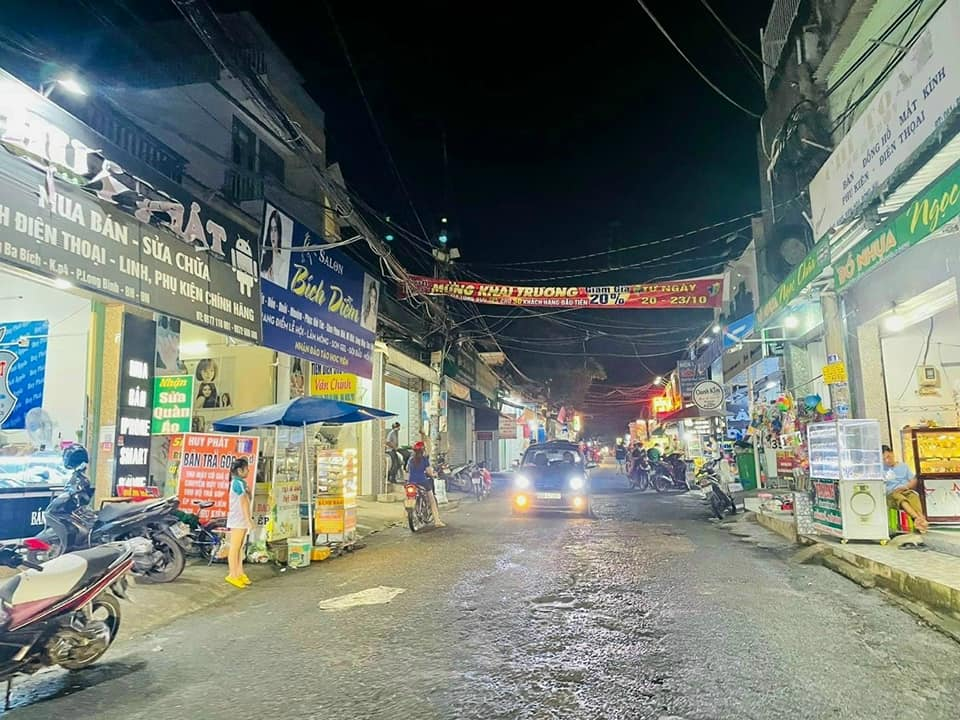
- Street in Market of Gate 10, Long Bình Ward

- Location in Vietnam
- Coordinates: 10°56′45″N 106°52′39″E
- Country: Vietnam
- Municipality: Đồng Nai

Area
  - Total: 17.34 sq mi (44.91 km^{2})

Population (2025)
  - Total: 168.614
- Time zone: UTC+7 (UTC+7)

Long Bình is a ward of Đồng Nai of Vietnam. It has an area of about 44.91 square kilometres (17.34 sq mi) and the population in 2025 was 168.614. Currently, it is the largest ward, also one of the most populous ward of the city.

Established in 1994, from the separation of two wards Tam Hòa and Phước Tân (the latter ward previously belonged to Long Thành district then). The ward is 7km away to the east from the city center.

== History ==
=== Vietnam War ===
During the Vietnam War, Long Binh Post was a major U.S. Army base, logistics center, and major command headquarters for United States Army Vietnam (USARV).

=== 2000s and 2010s ===
The area Long Binh, Bien Hoa, originally occupied by the Long Binh post is as of 2008 largely given over to industrial use, known as Long Binh Techno Park, and a shopping complex that includes a large western-style Cora supermarket. When it opens, Line 1 of the HCMC Metro will have its terminus at Long Binh, District 9, Ho Chi Minh City; work commenced in February 2008 on the Long Binh depot.
