= Long Hưng, Đồng Nai =

Long Hưng
- Ward
- Location in Vietnam
- Coordinates: 10°52′26″N 106°51′27″E
- Country: Vietnam
- Municipality: Đồng Nai

Area
  - Total: 4.5 sq mi (11.7 km^{2})

Population (2017)
  - Total: 6,874
- Time zone: UTC+7 (UTC+7)

Long Hưng is a ward located in Đồng Nai, Vietnam. It has an area of around 11.7km2 and the population in 2017 was 6,874.
