= Biên Hòa =

- Ward
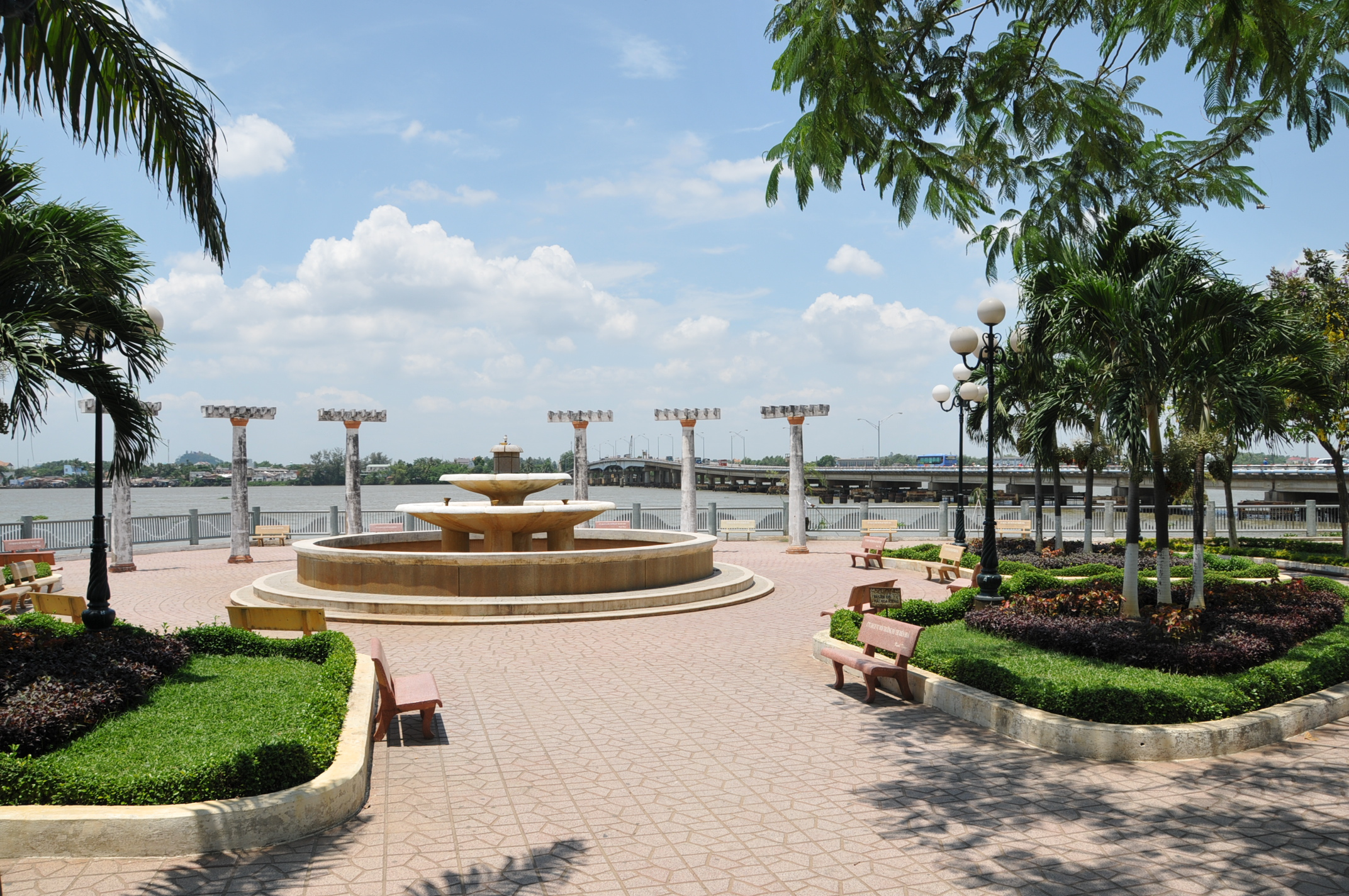
- Nguyễn Văn Trị Park

- Location within Vietnam
- Coordinates: 10°56′08″N 106°48′18″E
- Country: Vietnam
- Region: Southeast
- City: Đồng Nai
- Established: 16 June 2025
- Administrative headquarters: 2429 Nguyễn Ái Quốc Street, Hóa An Quarter

Area
  - Total: 21.47 km^{2} (8.29 sq mi)

Population (2025)
  - Total: 86,267
  - Density: 4,018/km^{2} (10,410/sq mi)
- Website: bienhoa.dongnai.gov.vn
- Administrative code: 26068.

Biên Hòa is a ward located in Đồng Nai, Vietnam. It has an area of roughly 21.47 km2 and its population as of 2025 was 86,267. It is the site of Bien Hoa Air Base.

== Geography ==
Biên Hòa ward has the following geographical boundaries:

- To the east, it borders Trấn Biên ward, with the Đồng Nai River forming the boundary.
- To the west and north, it borders Tân Đông Hiệp ward, Ho Chi Minh City.
- To the south, it borders Đông Hòa ward, Ho Chi Minh City.

== History ==
Under Resolution No. 1662/NQ-UBTVQH15 dated 16 June 2025 on the reorganization of commune-level administrative divisions in Đồng Nai province in 2025, the entire natural area and population of Tân Hạnh, Hóa An, Bửu Hòa and Tân Vạn wards, formerly part of Biên Hòa, were merged to form a new ward named Biên Hòa (Clause 68, Article 1). Following the merger, Biên Hòa ward had an area of 21.47 km^{2} and a population of 74,919.

On 24 April 2026, the National Assembly adopted Resolution No. 30/2026/QH16 on the establishment of Đồng Nai city as a centrally governed municipality, encompassing the entire natural area and population of Đồng Nai province. The resolution took effect on 30 April 2026. Since then, Biên Hòa ward has been part of Đồng Nai city.
