= Meldra Rosenberg =

Latvian model, beauty pageant titleholder

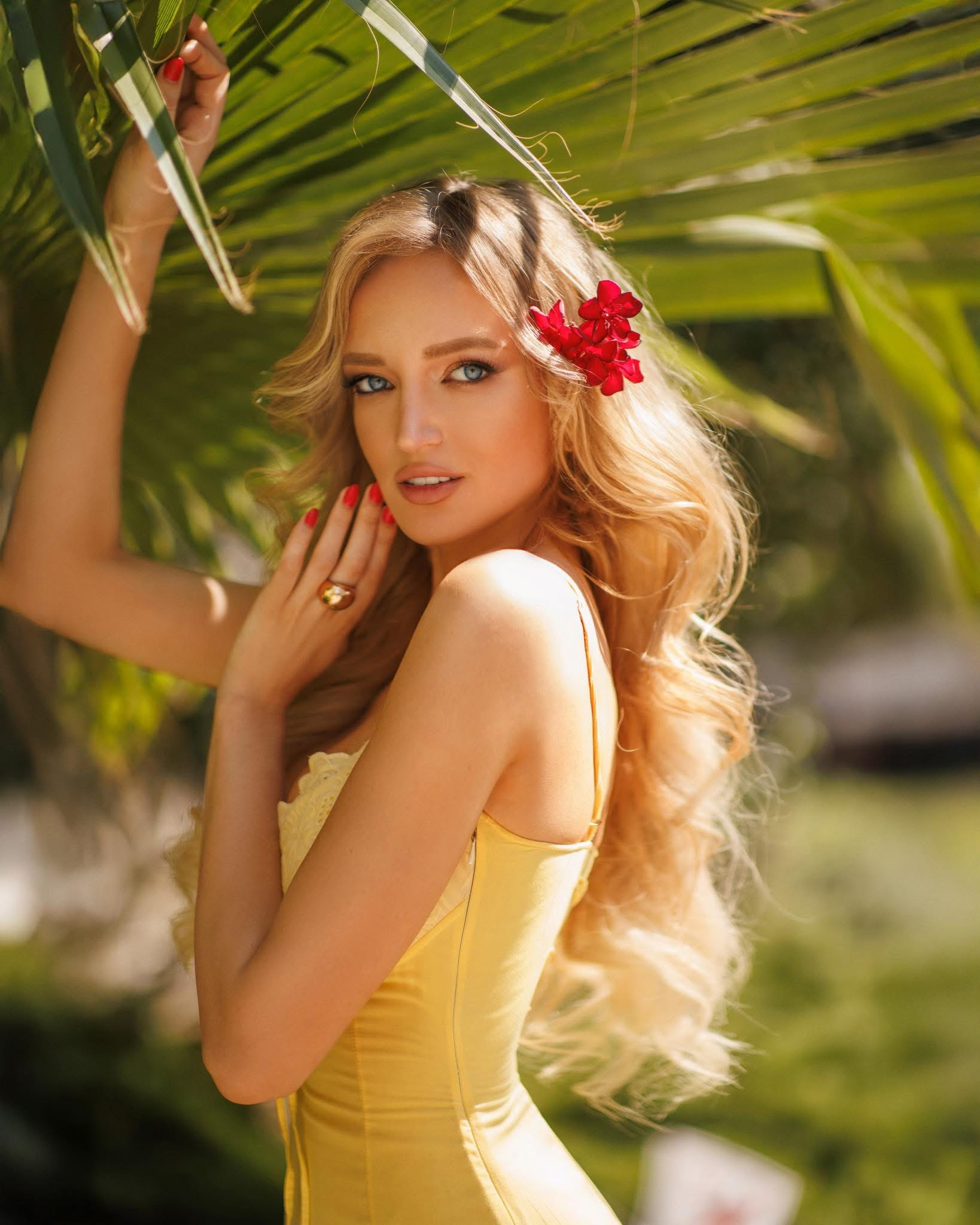
- Rosenberg in 2025
- Born: January 23, 2002 (age 24)
- Height: 178 cm (5 ft 10 in)
- Beauty pageant titleholder
- Title: Miss Universe Latvia
- Hair color: Blonde
- Eye color: Blue
- Major competitions: Miss Supertalent Season 20 (winner); Miss Supranational 2025 (Unplaced); Miss Universe Latvia 2025 (Winner); Miss Universe 2025 (Unplaced)

Meldra Rosenberg (born 23 January 2002) is a Latvian tv host, model and beauty pageant titleholder. She gained recognition after winning Miss Supertalent Season 20 in 2024 in PyeongChang, South Korea, and representing Latvia at the Miss Supranational 2025 pageant in Lesser Poland, Poland. She represented Latvia at Miss Universe 2025 held in Thailand.

== Early life ==
Meldra Rosenberg was born on 23 January 2002 in Latvia to a mixed Latvian-German family, with her father being Latvian and her mother German.

Rosenberg began her modeling career at the age of 11.

== Career ==
=== Modeling and beauty pageants ===
In 2024, Rosenberg won Miss Supertalent World Season 20, a televised model competition held in PyeongChang, South Korea, where she competed against 50 other models.

Following this achievement, she was selected as the official representative of Latvia for the Miss Supranational 2025 pageant, which took place on 27 June 2025 in Poland.

=== Event hosting and fashion ===
During Paris Fashion Week Spring/Summer 2025 (SS25), she participated as both a runway model and an event host at The Westin Paris – Vendôme.

== Pageantry in 2025 ==
=== Miss Supranational ===
Rosenberg represented Latvia at Miss Supranational 2025, held in Lesser Poland, but was unplaced; she also marked Latvia's return to the pageant after a 10-year absence.

=== Miss Universe ===
On 6 September, Rosenberg was crowned Miss Universe Latvia 2025 and represented her country at the Miss Universe pageant, which was held in Thailand on 21 November 2025.

Awards and achievements
Preceded by (Japan) Nao Matsumura	Miss Supertalent Season 20; 2024	Succeeded by (United Kingdom) Paige Loren
Preceded by None	Miss Supranational Latvia; 2025	Succeeded by Incumbent
Preceded by Marija Vicinska	Miss Universe Latvia; 2025	Succeeded by Lāsma Kuhtarska
