= Hotel Continental Saigon =

Hotel in Ho Chi Minh City, Vietnam

Coordinates: 10°46′37″N 106°42′09″E

- Khách sạn Hoàn Cầu; Khách sạn Continental Sài Gòn
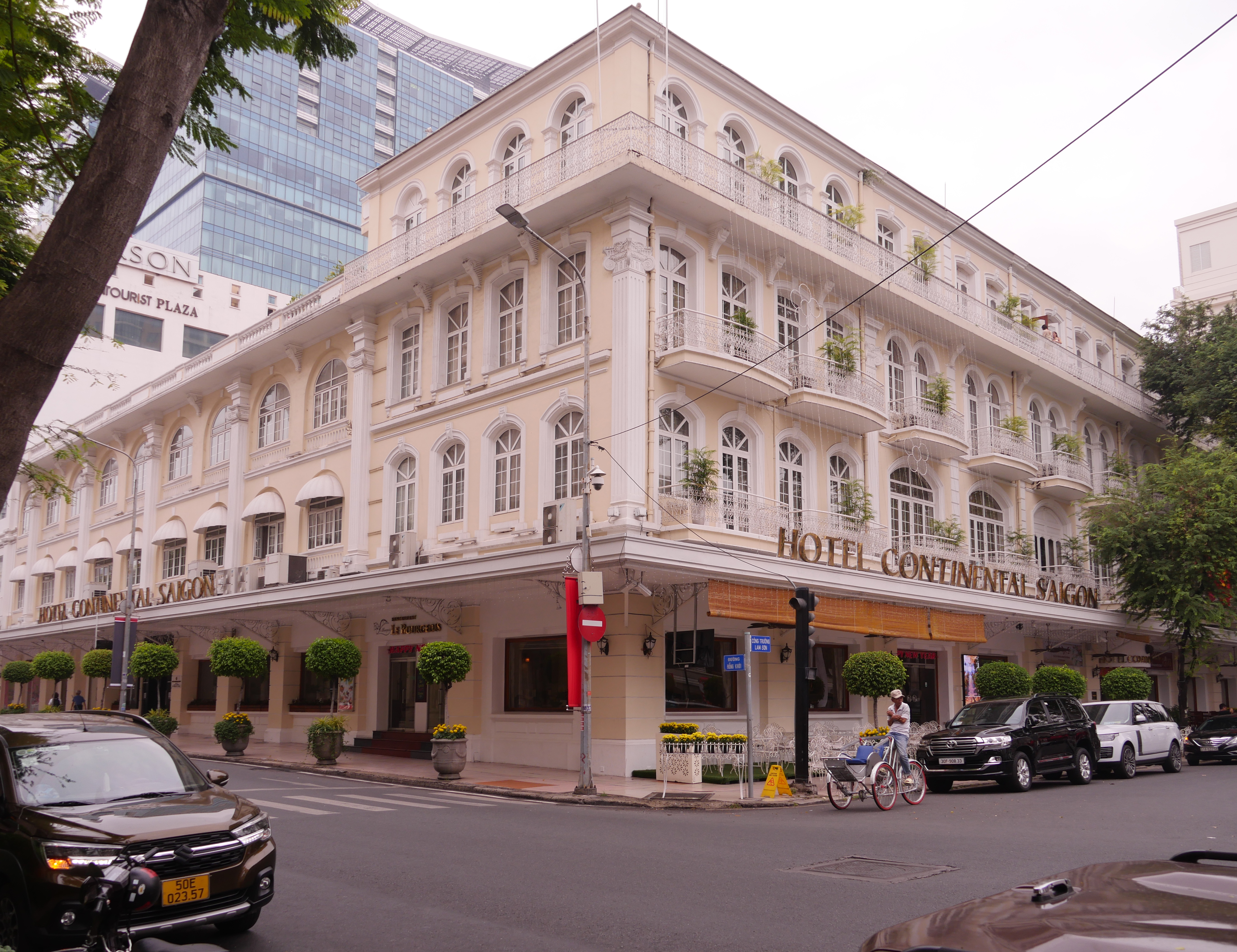
- Hotel Continental Saigon in 2023
- Former names: Đại Lục Lữ Quán (1960-1970)
- Alternative names: Continental Palace

General information
- Architectural style: French colonial
- Location: Lam Sơn Square, 132-134 Đồng Khởi Street, Saigon, Ho Chi Minh City, Vietnam
- Named for: Hôtel Continental
- Year built: 2
- Construction started: 1878
- Inaugurated: 1880
- Owner: Saigontourist Group

Height
- Top floor: 3

Technical details
- Floor count: 4 (The first storey is marked as G)

Design and construction
- Known for: The oldest hotel in Vietnam

Other information
- Number of rooms: 86
- Public transit: L1 Opera House station

Website
- Hotel Continental Saigon

Hôtel Continental or Hôtel Continental Saïgon, (Vietnamese: Khách sạn Hoàn Cầu, Khách sạn Continental Sài Gòn), is a historic hotel in Saigon, the central ward of Ho Chi Minh City, Vietnam. The hotel is located at the corner of Đồng Khởi Street and Lam Sơn Square, by the Saigon Municipal Theatre. Built in 1878 and opened in 1880 during the French Indochina and named after the Hôtel Continental in Paris, it is recognized as the oldest hotel in Vietnam. The hotel has been undergone refurbishments over the years, while still maintaining the essence of its original architecture and style. The hotel is owned by the state-owned Saigon Tourist Group.

== History ==
In the first days of French colonial Vietnam, Saigon's roads were simply named by ordinal numbers. Starting from the Saigon River bank, Đồng Khởi Street was the Rue N°6 (Sixth Road) and already a busy commercial street then. In 1865, the French Commander Admiral de la Grandière renamed these roads, including Rue No°6 to become Rue Catinat.

In 1878, Pierre Cazeau, a home-appliance and construction material manufacturer, started building a hotel with the purpose of providing travelers a French style of luxury accommodation after a long cruise to the new continent. This project took two years, and in 1880 the Hotel Continental was inaugurated.

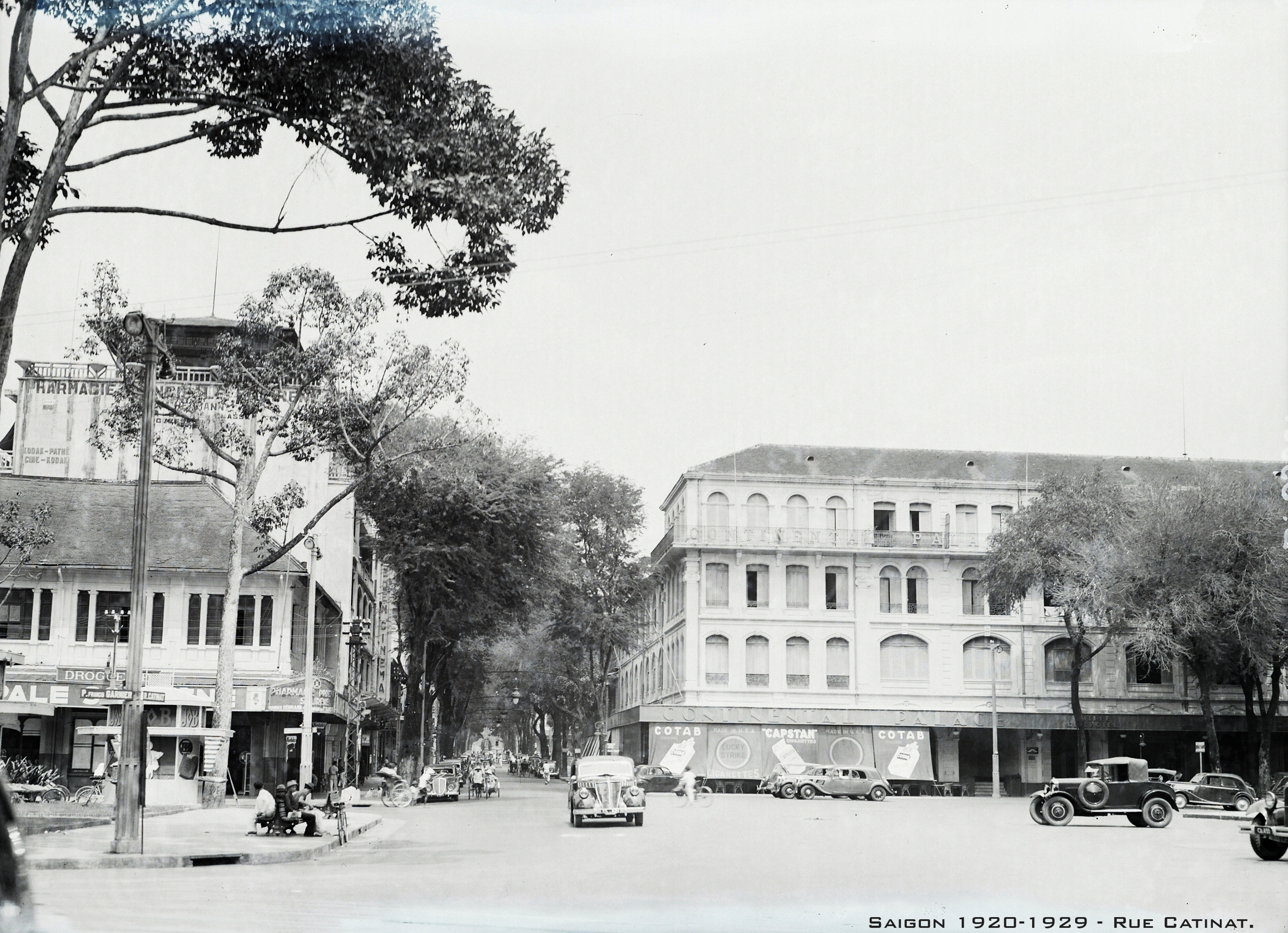
The Continental Palace in the 1920s

The hotel was refurbished in 1892 by Mr. Grosstephan. In 1911, the hotel was sold to Duke Montpensier. In 1930, the hotel had a new owner, Mathieu Franchini, a reputed gangster from Corsica, and later his son Philippe who ran the hotel until the Communist takeover in April 1975.

The Continental had a notable role in the social and political life of Saigon during the French Colonial Era.

During the First Indochina War the Hotel Continental was frequently referred to as Radio Catinat, since this was the rendezvous point where correspondents, journalists, politicians and businessmen talked about politics, the business news, and current events.

Following the French partition of Vietnam in 1955, Rue Catinat was renamed Tự Do Street, while Place Garnier was renamed Lam Sơn Square.

During the Vietnam War era the hotel was renamed the Continental Palace and became popular with journalists who nicknamed the ground-floor bar the Continental Shelf. Newsweek and Time magazines each had their Saigon bureaux on the second floor of the hotel.

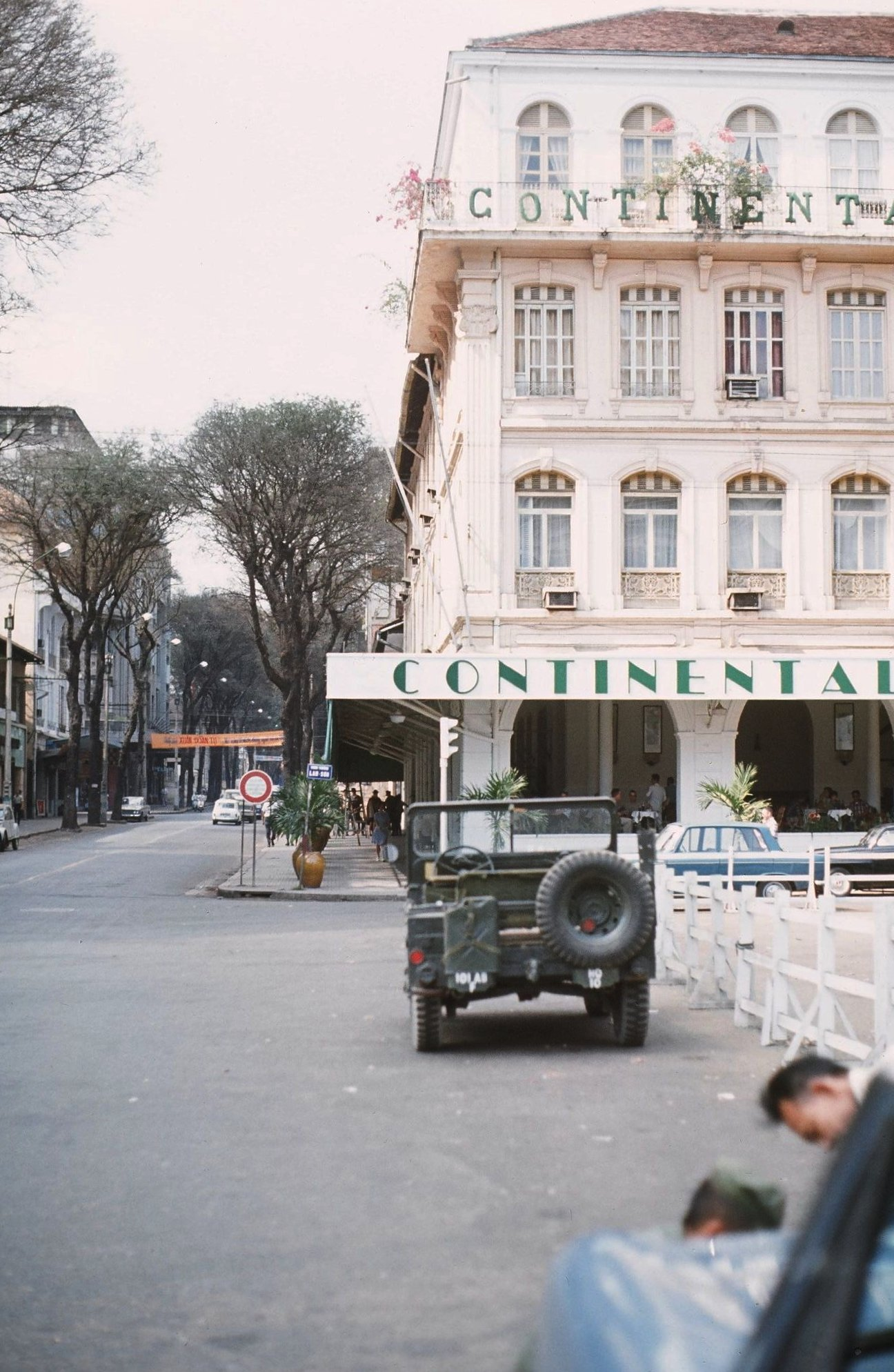
View of the Continental and Tự Do Street in 1968

Following the Fall of Saigon in April 1975 ownership of the hotel was taken over by the Ho Chi Minh City Government and Tự Do Street was renamed Đồng Khởi Street.

The hotel was closed in 1976 and reopened again in 1986. The hotel was completely restored from 1988-9 and reopened in 1989 as the Hotel Continental.

== Facilities ==
Hotel Lobby with Le Bourgeois restaurant next to

The Hotel Continental Saigon featuring spa, restaurants and bars:

- Le Bourgeois: an À la carte restaurant serving Vietnamese dishes and bread with butter and jam for breakfast, Western cuisine for lunch and dinner, at the ground floor on the corner of Đồng Khởi Street with Lam Sơn Square
- Opera View Café, ground floor with private VIP Room serving gourmet cuisine
- Continental Patio: a buffet restaurant and wedding hall located at the hotel ground floor the central garden courtyard
- Conference room: a 200 square metres (2,200 sq ft) conference hall with a capacity of up to 200 guests at the ground floor, next to hotel’s courtyard
- Le Jardin Bar: At 2nd floor garden courtyard
- Jasmine Massage Spa

== Boutiques ==
The ground floor of the Hotel Continental Saigon previously consisted mainly of small private souvenir shops, restaurants, classic silk tailor shops, or service offices, and did not yet have large international luxury boutiques with long-term leases.

On June 9, 2015, two Swatch luxury watch brands, Blancpain and Breguet officially opened their first boutiques in Vietnam at the Unit G2 and G3, Opera Wing of the Hotel Continental Saigon, marked the hotel's first two boutiques from international brands, both are distributed by Swiss Master Time.

In 2024 festive season, Saint Laurent marked their comeback in Vietnam market with a boutique at the Ground Floor on Đồng Khởi Street side since the first boutique at Union Square Saigon opposite to the current location in 2016, it is their one of only seven stores worldwide designed according to the company's new architectural language with significant Haussmanian-style arch. S&S Group is the boutique retailer.

The high-end Hanoi-based lacquerware brand Hanoia has a large flagship store next to Saint Laurent boutique, it was opened on 2025 festive season with Tam Sơn of Openasia Group as the store retailer.

At the end of January 2026, S&S Group officially opened their luxury shopping space, SIS Continental at the ground floor of the hotel. The "SIS" stands for Shop-in-shop retail model, featuring: Brunello Cucinelli, Givenchy, Tom Ford, Berluti. However, in October of the same year, the site of SIS was allegedly replaced by Tam Sơn Living as Tam Sơn post on rheir official Facebook page about opening the store here that coincided with the former SIS site, it features: Bernardaud, Christofle, Devialet and Lalique.

== In popular culture ==
The hotel features prominently in Graham Greene's novel The Quiet American and in its two film adaptations in 1958 and 2002; however, the 2002 version was actually filmed in the opposite Caravelle Hotel as a “stand-in” due to production issues.

== See also ==
- Heritage hotels in Vietnam
- Sofitel Legend Metropole Hanoi
- List of historic buildings in Ho Chi Minh City
