= Miss Grand Latvia =

Beauty pageant in Latvia

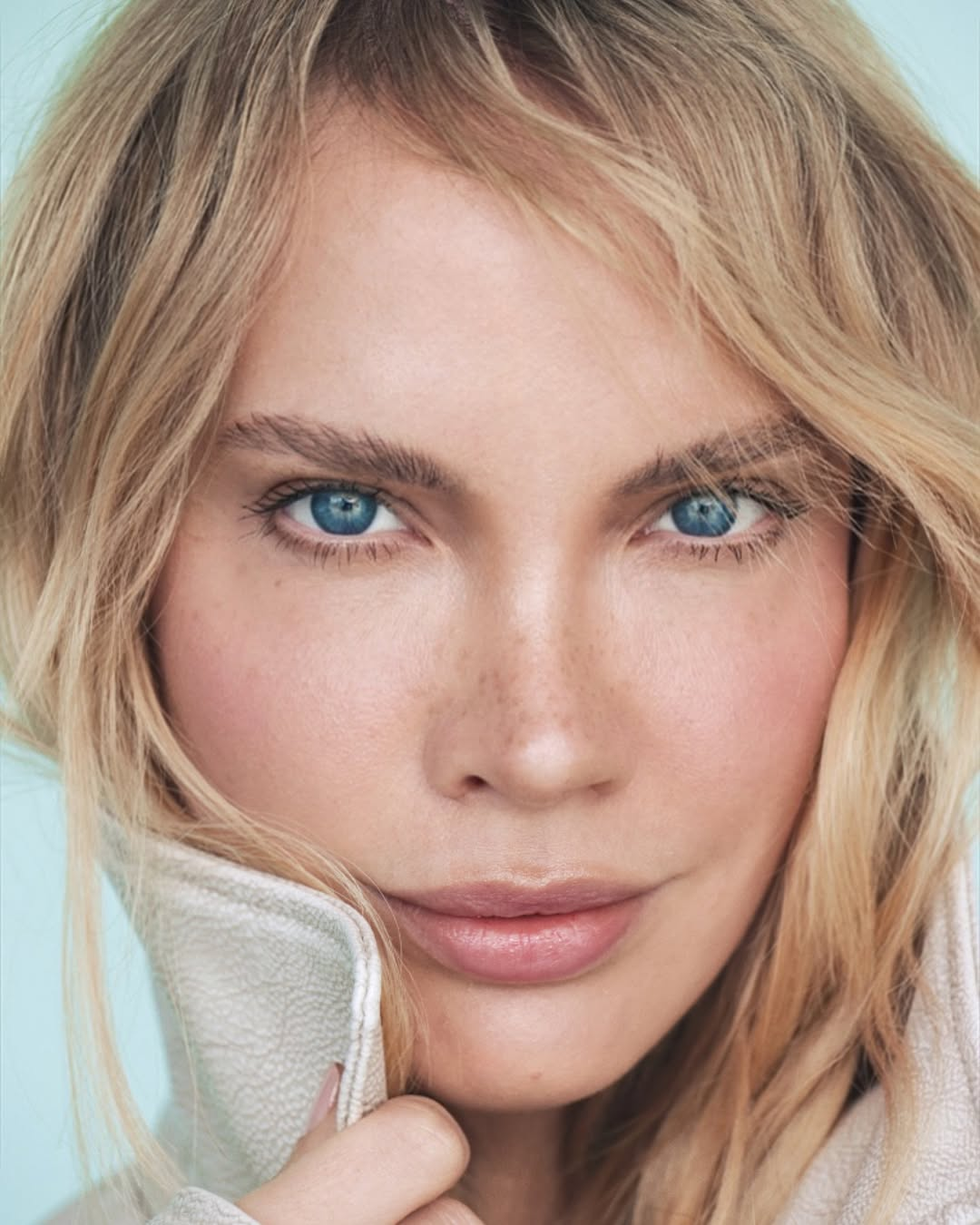
- Kate Alexeeva Miss Grand Latvia 2019
- Formation: 2013
- Type: Beauty pageant
- Headquarters: Riga
- Location: Latvia
- Members: Miss Grand International
- Official language: Latvian
- Parent organization: Mis Latvija (2013); Exclusive Events International (2019)

Miss Grand Latvia is a national beauty pageant title awarded to Latvian representatives competing at the Miss Grand International pageant. The title was first awarded in 2013, when the director of Mis Latvija, Inta Fogele, assigned the winner of Miss Rezekne 2013, Kristīne Rancāne, to represent Latvia at the inaugural edition of the mentioned international contest in Thailand, where she won the Best in Swimsuit award and was placed among the top 10 finalists, which was considered the only and highest placement for Latvian representatives at Miss Grand International.

The license of Miss Grand Latvia was transferred to Exclusive Events International in 2019. However, since 2020, the Miss Grand Latvia license has not been purchased by any other agency.

== History ==
Since the inception of the Miss Grand International pageant, Latvia rarely sent its representative to compete. The first Latvian candidate to compete at such was Kristīne Rancāne, the winner of Miss Rezekne 2013 who was appointed by the director of the Mis Latvija pageant, Inta Fogele. However, the contract between Mis Latvija and Miss Grand International was not extended caused Latvia to absence in the contest from 2014 to 2015.

In 2019, the license of Miss Grand Latvia was purchased by a Romanian-based event organizer, Exclusive Events International, which selected the Latvian candidates through an online application, and a 25-year-old international model and influencer from Riga, Jekaterina Aleksejeva, was elected the winner. Aleksejeva later competed internationally in Venezuela, but was unplaced.

== International competition ==
The following is a list of Latvian representatives at the Miss Grand International contest.

| Year | Representative | Original national title | Competition performance | |
| Year | Representative | Original national title | Placement | Other awards |
|---|---|---|---|---|
| 2013 | Kristīne Rancāne | Miss Rēzekne 2013 | Top 10 | Best in Swimsuit |
| 2016 | Meldra Rozenberga | —N/a | Unplaced | —N/a |
| 2019 | Kate Alexeeva | —N/a | Unplaced | —N/a |
No representatives from 2020 to 2023
| 2024 | Sabina Saharova | Miss Latvia 2016 Finalist | Did not compete | |
Color keys for the Placements at Miss Grand International Declared as the winner Ended as a runner-up (Top 5) Ended as a finalist (Top 10) Ended as a semifinalist (Top 20/21)
