= List of historic buildings in Ho Chi Minh City =

List of historic buildings in Ho Chi Minh City:

Buildings in Ho Chi Minh city have a variety of foreign influences, notably from China and France, two countries that once ruled over Vietnam.

== 18th century ==
Building	Year completed	Style
Citadel of Saigon	1790	Vietnamese

== 19th century ==
Building	Year completed	Style
Phung Son Pagoda	1802–1820	Chinese architecture
Quan Âm Pagoda	1816	Chinese architecture
Saigon Notre-Dame Basilica (Notre Dame Cathedral, Ho Chi Minh City)	1877–1883	Neo-Romanesque
Hotel Continental Saigon	1880	French Colonial
Thiên Hậu Temple	19th century	Chinese architecture
Mariamman Temple	late 19th century	Hindu
Museum of Ho Chi Minh City - formerly Gia Long Palace	1885–1890	Neo-Classical
Saigon Central Post Office	1886–1891	French Colonial
Municipal Theatre of Ho Chi Minh City	1897	French Colonial

== 1900-1909 ==
Building	Year completed	Style
Bình Tây Market	early 20th century	Chinese architecture/Vietnamese architecture
Giác Lâm Pagoda	1900	Vietnamese
Phuoc An Hoi Quan Pagoda	1902	Chinese architecture
Ho Chi Minh City Hall	1902–1908	French Colonial

== 1910s ==
Building	Year completed	Style
Bến Thành Market	1912	French Colonial

== 1920s ==
Building	Year completed	Style
Hotel Majestic	1925	French Colonial and classical French Riviera
Rex Hotel	1927	
Temple of Hùng King	1929	Vietnamese
Ho Chi Minh City Museum of History	1929	Vietnamese

== 1930s ==
Building	Year completed	Style
Saigon Central Mosque	1935	Indo-Islamic architecture

== 1940s ==
Building	Year completed	Style
Ấn Quang Pagoda	1948	Vietnamese
