= Lāsma Kuhtarska =

Latvian beauty pageant titleholder

- Born: Riga, Latvia
- Education: Stockholm School of Economics
- Beauty pageant titleholder
- Title: Miss Universe Latvia 2026
- Years active: 2018–present
- Major competitions: Miss Universe 2026; (TBD)

Lāsma Kuhtarska is a Latvian businesswoman and beauty pageant titleholder. She is a co-founder of Noda, a fintech company, which she co-founded in 2018. She was appointed Miss Universe Latvia 2026 and is set to represent Latvia at Miss Universe 2026 in San Juan, Puerto Rico

== Early life and education ==
Kuhtarska was born and raised in Riga, Latvia. She studied at the Stockholm School of Economics.

== Career ==
Kuhtarska worked in financial analysis at the Bank of Latvia and at SEB Group, a banking group operating in Sweden and the Baltic region. In 2018, she co-founded Noda, a fintech company specializing in open banking and account-to-account payments.

== Pageantry ==
In 2026, Kuhtarska was appointed Miss Universe Latvia 2026. She is set to represent Latvia at Miss Universe 2026 in San Juan, Puerto Rico.

Awards and achievements
Preceded by Meldra Rosenberg	Miss Universe Latvia; 2026	Incumbent
