= Miss Universe Latvia =

National beauty pageant competition in Latvia

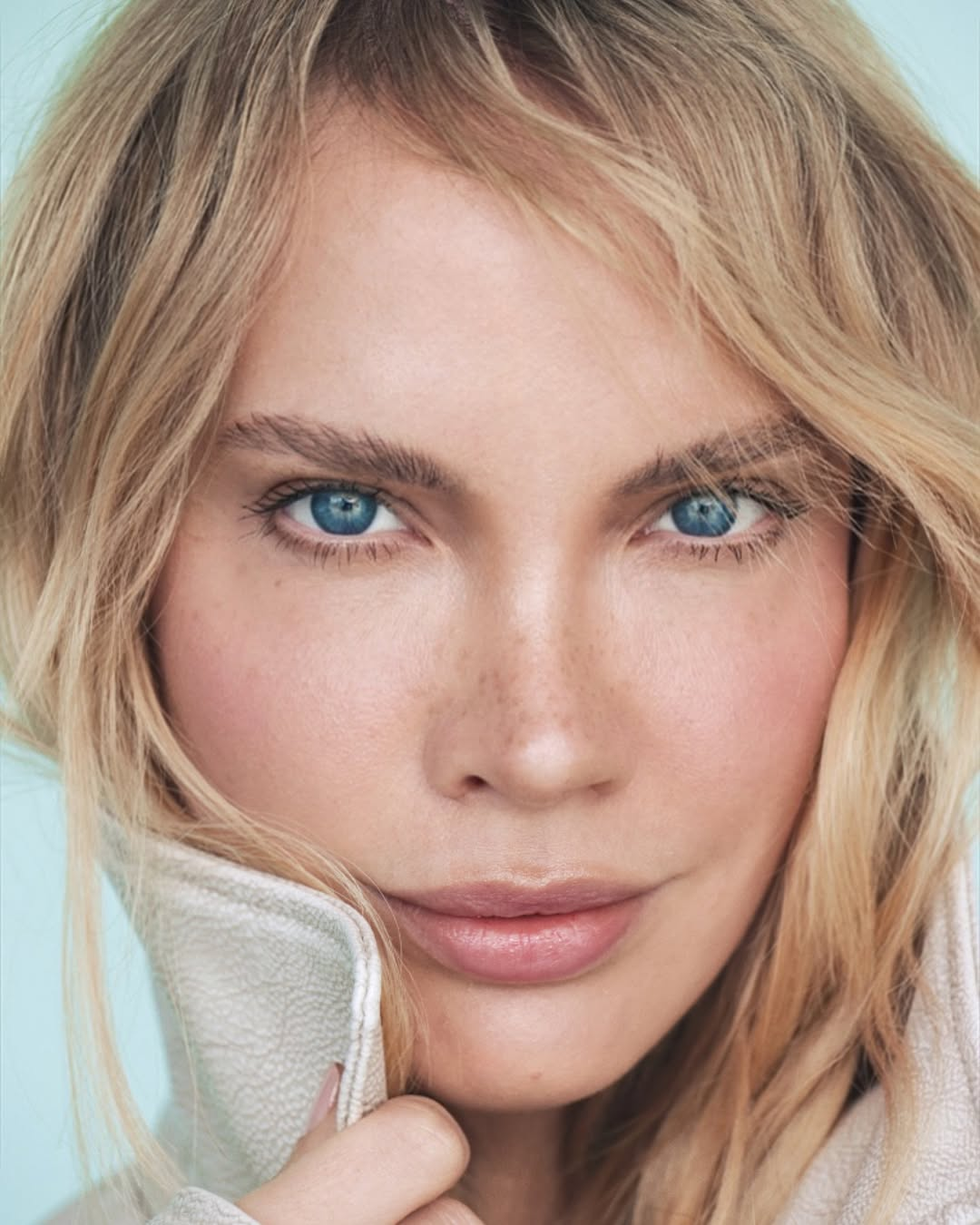
- Miss Universe 2023 Kate Alexeeva
- Formation: 2005
- Type: Beauty pageant
- Headquarters: Riga
- Location: Latvia
- Members: Miss Universe
- Official language: Latvian
- President: Inga Raduga

Miss Universe Latvia (Miss Universe Latvija) is a national Beauty pageant that selects the Latvian representative to the Miss Universe pageant. The contestants represent the 7 cities and 26 districts.

== History ==
In 2005, Bravo Productions was awarded the rights to send Latvian representative to Miss Universe 2005 pageant to be held in Bangkok, Thailand. Ieva Kokoreviča became the first ever Miss Universe Latvia in an event held at the SAS Radisson in Riga on April 7, 2005. As well as having debuted, Latvia was also called out to the semi-finals (and finals) for the first time. The last Miss Universe Latvia is Sanita Kubliņa, who was crowned on April 5, 2006, in Riga. She represented Latvia in the Miss Universe 2006 competition in Los Angeles, California, but did not place. From 2007 up to 2021, Miss Universe Latvia did not compete in the Miss Universe pageant. The organization lost the franchise 12 years after the pageant was postponed. Began 2022, Inga Raduga Model Management under Inga Raduga directorship took over the license of Miss Universe pageant.

== Miss Universe license holder in Latvia ==
- Bravo Production (2005—2006)
- Inga Raduga (2022—Present)

== Titleholders ==
- : Declared as Winner
- : Ended as runner-up or top 5/6 qualification
- : Ended as one of the finalists or semifinalists
- : Ended as special awards winner

Year	Municipality	Miss Universe Latvija	Placement at Miss Universe	Special Award(s)	Notes
Inga Raduga directorship — a franchise holder to Miss Universe from 2022
2026	Riga	Lāsma Kuhtarska	TBA		
2025	Riga	Meldra Rosenberg	Unplaced		
2024	Riga	Maria Vicinska	Unplaced		
2023	Riga	Kate Alexeeva	Unplaced		Alexeeva was supposed to participate at Miss Universe 2022, but due to testing positive for COVID-19, she was allocated to represent Latvia at Miss Universe 2023.
Bravo Production directorship — a franchise holder to Miss Universe between 2005―2006
Did not compete between 2007—2022
2006	Ogre	Sanita Kubliņa	Unplaced		
2005	Limbaži	Ieva Kokoreviča	Top 10		

== See also ==
- Mis Latvija
