= Kate Alexeeva =

Latvian beauty queen and model

- Кате Алексеева
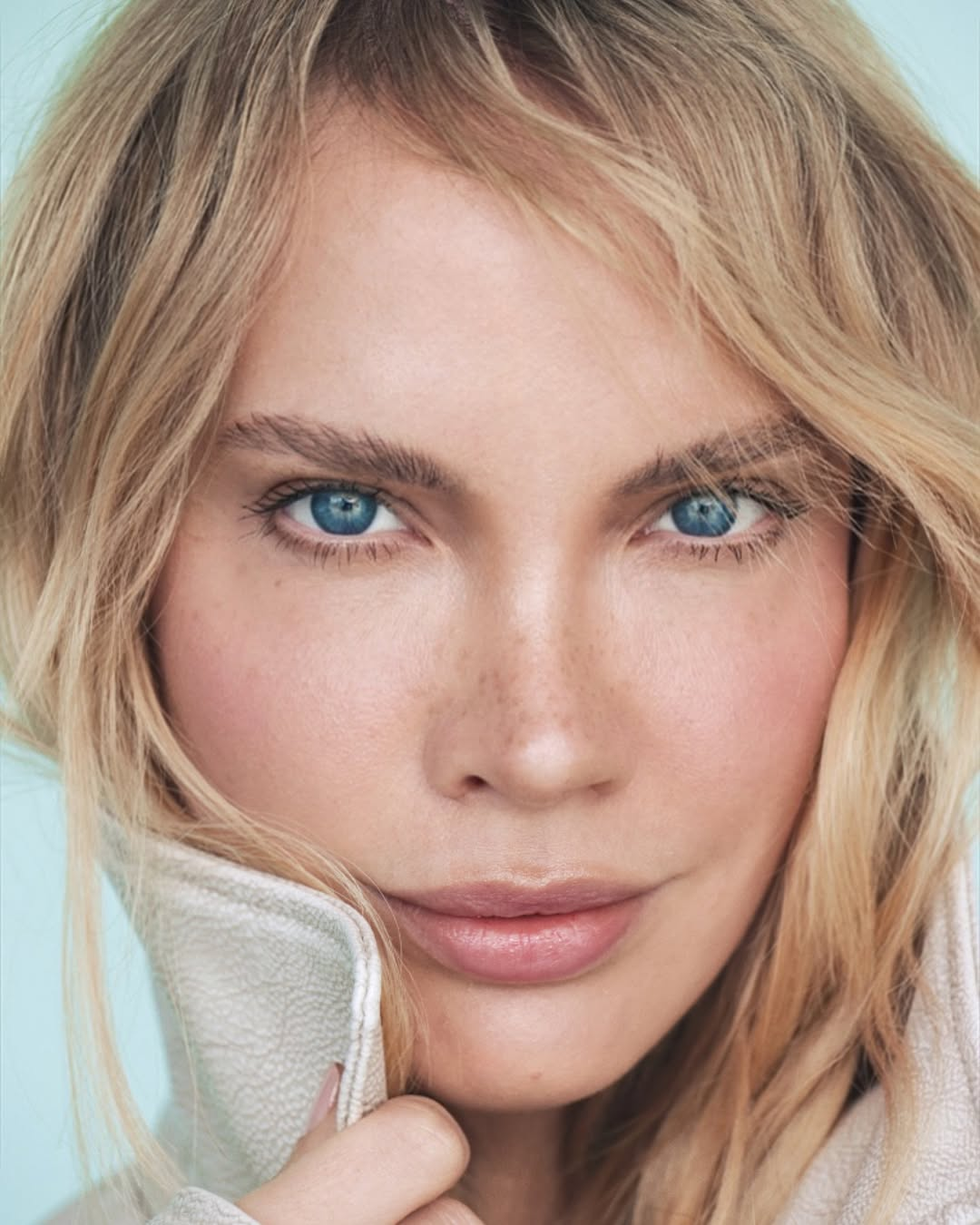
- Alexeeva in 2025
- Born: Jekaterina Aleksejeva; Riga, Latvia
- Education: Regent's University London; Royal Central School of Speech and Drama
- Occupations: Beauty queen; influencer; model; philanthropist
- Known for: Holding various beauty pageant titles
- Height: 1.76 m (5 ft 9 in)
- Beauty pageant titleholder
- Title: Top Model of the World Latvia 2017; Miss Grand Latvia 2019; Miss Multiverse Latvia 2019; Miss Universe Latvia 2023
- Hair color: Blonde
- Eye color: Blue
- Major competitions: Top Model of the World; Miss Grand International 2019; Miss Universe 2023; (Unplaced)

Jekaterina "Kate" Alexeeva is a Latvian model, influencer, philanthropist and beauty pageant titleholder. She was crowned Miss Universe Latvia, and represented her country at the Miss Universe 2023 in El Salvador. Previously, she was crowned Miss Grand Latvia and represented her country at Miss Grand International in 2019 and at the Top Model of the World in 2017.

== Life ==
Jekaterina Alexeeva was born in Riga, Latvia, into a Latvian family. Fluent in Latvian, Russian, and English, Alexeeva has traveled extensively, visiting over 56 countries, which has influenced her global perspective and advocacy work.

== Career ==
=== Modelling ===
Kate Alexeeva started her professional career in 2010 as a fashion model and has collaborated with brands like Prada, Dolce & Gabbana, and Coach.

=== Beauty pageants ===
In July 2017, Alexeeva represented Latvia at Top Model of the world pageant held in El Gouna, Egypt.

In 2019 she was crowned as Miss Grand Latvia and she represented her country at the Miss Grand International 2019 pageant held in Caracas Venezuela.

Also in 2019, she competed in the Miss Multiverse 2019 pageant in Punta Cana, Dominican Republic, where she won the Miss Photogenic award and placed as fourth runner-up.

In October 2022, Alexeeva was crowned Miss Universe Latvia. She was scheduled to participate in the 71st Miss Universe pageant in New Orleans in January 2023, but withdrew after testing positive for COVID-19.

In 2023, Alexeeva participated in the 72nd Miss Universe pageant held in El Salvador to represent Latvia. She performed at the 76th Cannes Film Festival in Cannes, France in the same year.

== Philanthropy ==
Alexeeva is a vocal advocate for survivors of domestic violence, drawing from her experience in the modelling and entrepreneurial careers. In her "Voice for Change" video for the Miss Universe 2023 pageant, she spoke out in support of those affected by domestic violence and expressed her ambition of creating a safe and sustainable community for survivors in the Baltic region.

== Awards and achievements ==
Awards and achievements
Preceded by Sanita Kubliņa	Miss Universe Latvia; 2023	Succeeded by Maria Vicinska
Preceded by -	Miss Grand Latvia; 2019	Succeeded by Sabina Saharova
