= Sofitel Legend Metropole Hanoi =

Hotel in Hanoi, Vietnam

- Khách sạn Thống Nhất
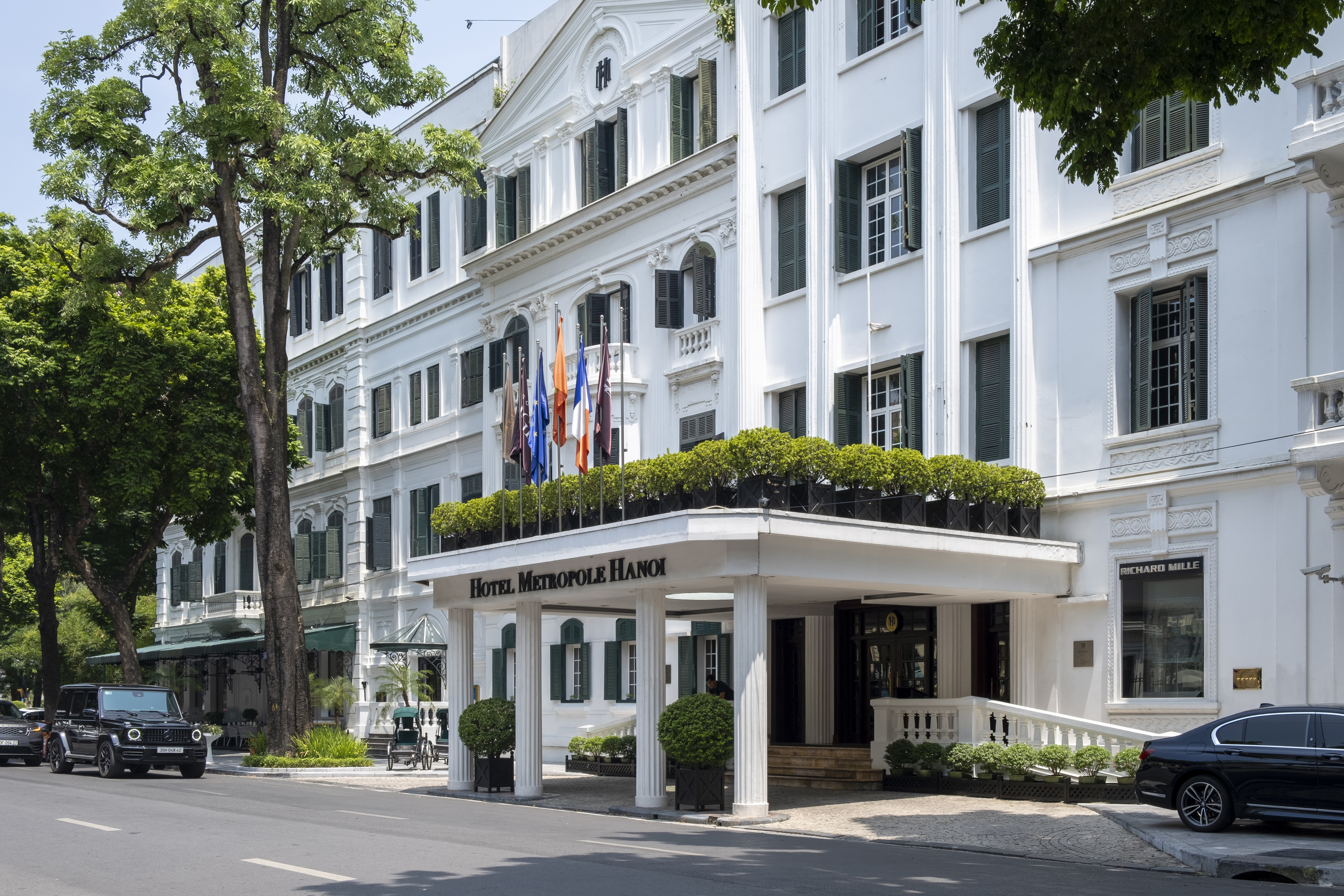
- Front entrance on 15 Ngô Quyền Street
- Former names: Pullman Hotel Metropole Hanoi (1992–1995)
- Hotel chain: Accor

General information
- Location: 15 Ngô Quyền Street–56 Lý Thái Tổ Street (entrances) & 13 Lê Phụng Hiểu Street (restaurants), Hoàn Kiếm, Hanoi, Vietnam
- Coordinates: 21.0255°N 105.8555°E
- Opening: August 1901; 125 years ago
- Owner: S.E.M Thống Nhất Metropole Hotel Company Limited
- Operator: Sofitel Legend

Technical details
- Floor count: Heritage Wing: 3; Opera Wing: 7

Design and construction
- Developer: André Ducamp & Gustave-Émile Dumoutier

Other information
- Number of rooms: 358
- Number of restaurants: 6 (Le Beaulieu, Spices Garden, angelina, Le Club, Bamboo Bar, La Terrasse)

Website
- Sofitel Legend Metropole

The Sofitel Legend Metropole Hanoi is a historic five-star luxury hotel in Hanoi, the capital of Vietnam. Opened in 1901 as the Grand Métropole Hotel, the 358-room hotel is one of the most prominent surviving examples of French colonial architecture in Indochina.

== History ==
1900s

In 1899, prominent archeologist and historian Gustave-Émile Dumoutier, Director of the Tonkin Department of Education, files a request to convert the buildings on his land at the corner of Boulevard Henri-Rivière (now Ngô Quyền Street) into a hotel. Businessman André Ducamp invested 500,000 francs of capital into the venture and became the hotel's first administrator.

The Grand Métropole Hôtel opened in August 1901 as the largest and most modern hotel in French Indochina, operated by the French Freehold Company (Compagnie Française Immobilière). In 1902, arc lamps were installed in front of the hotel to brighten the night. In 1908, an extension of 30 rooms overlooking the Chavassieux (Diên Hồng) garden was opened.

The hotel is managed by a professional manager, Frenchman Edouard Lion. It is regarded by visitors as "a luxurious, though expensive abode". In addition to French, the Métropole provided guest services in English and German.

1910-20s

In 1916, the Métropole becomes the first venue in Indochina to show motion pictures. Its long-stay packages were judged to be of "remarkably good value" in the 1920s: three adults and two small children can rent two large rooms with bath, electric fan, French haute cuisine and ice supply for 250 piastres a month.

In 1923, English writer Somerset Maugham stayed at the Métropole while writing The Gentleman in the Parlour, a nonfiction record of his Asian voyage from Rangoon to Haiphong.

1930s

Between 1930 and 1934, the Great Depression devastated the Indochinese colonial economy. By that time, the French Freehold Company had expanded into a hotel chain operating the Grand Hôtel de Doson (Khách sạn Lớn Đồ Sơn) in Đồ Sơn, Hải Phòng, the Hôtel de la Cascade d’Argent (Khách sạn Thác Bạc) in Tam Đảo, the Grand Hôtel de Chapa (Khách sạn Lớn Sa Pa) in Sa Pa, and the Hôtel des Trois Maréchaux (Khách sạn Ba Thống chế) in Lạng Sơn; as well as the ‘Wagons-restaurants des trains directs’, a luxury train service with onboard dining running direct between Hanoi and Vinh – Huế – Tourane.

In 1936, Charlie Chaplin and his wife Paulette Goddard stayed at the Métropole to celebrate their honeymoon after marrying in secret in Canton. Crowds gathered in front of the hotel to welcome the celebrity actors.

1940s

In 1946, the French owners sold the Métropole to Chinese businessman Giu Sinh Hoi, who moved permanently into Room 115 as the General Manager.

Ho Chi Minh used the Métropole on several occasions as a meeting place. In 1946, he hosted talks in the conference room with French general Etienne Valuie and Vietnamese politician Nguyễn Hải Thần, in the small wing where the lobby bar is located today. He occasionally used the hotel for meetings again in 1960.

1950s

Following the French defeat at Điện Biên Phủ, the division of Vietnam and the liberation of Hanoi by Viet Minh forces in 1954, the Métropole was nationalized and renamed the Thống Nhất (Reunification) Hotel by the communist government, and was used as the official government guest house.

In his first visit to Hanoi in 1951, English author Graham Greene stayed at the Métropole while visiting his friend Arthur Trevor-Wilson, resident British consul and MI6 operative. His experiences in Vietnam formed the basis of the 1955 novel The Quiet American.

1960-70s

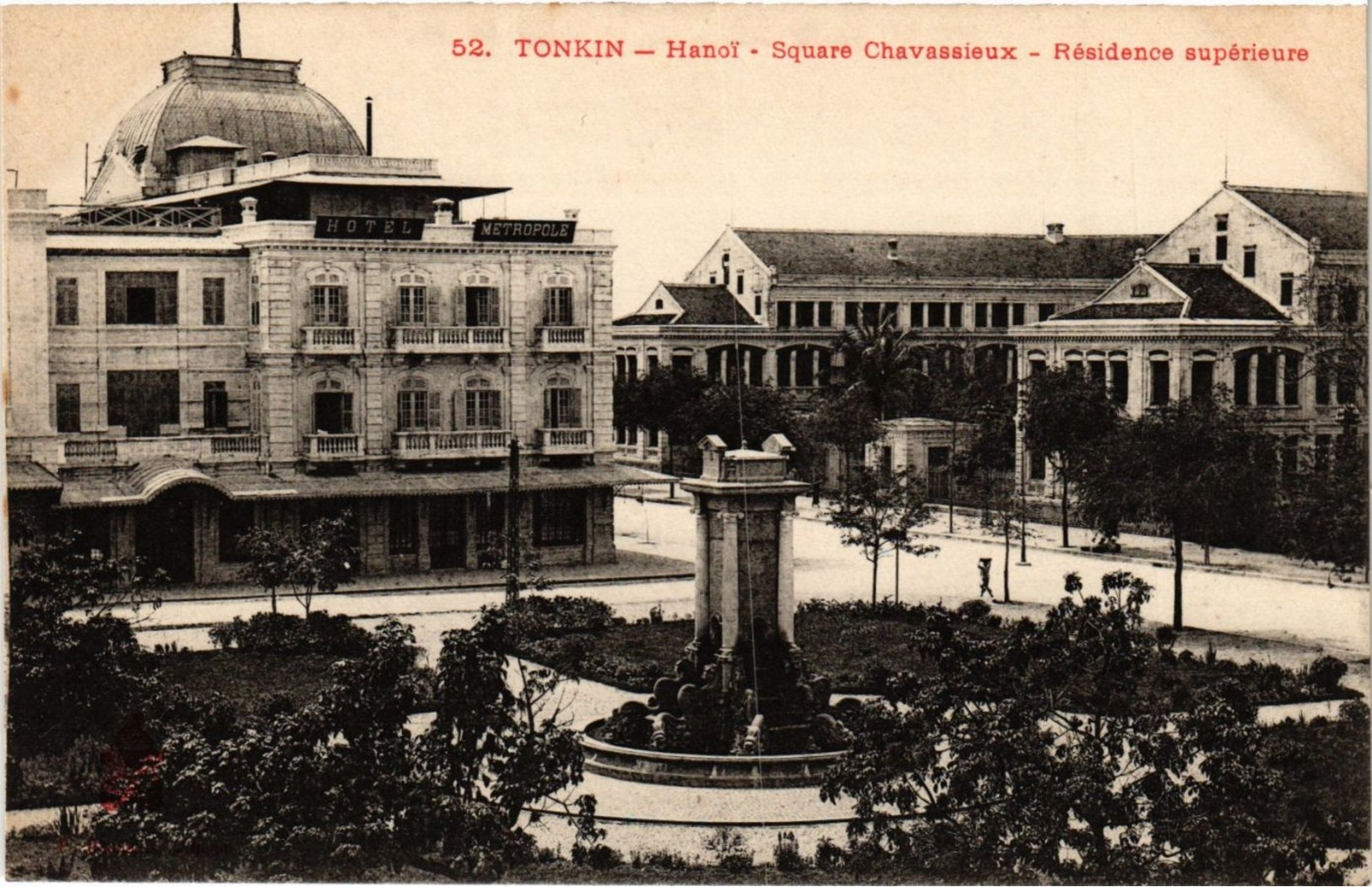
Hotel Metropole in colonial Hanoi

In 1962, major reconstruction works added a fourth floor and 29 rooms (301-329) to the main building. The prominent copper dome topping the central pavilion's mansard roof was removed during this renovation.

In 1964, with American air raids imminent, hotel managers built a bomb shelter in the courtyard of the hotel to protect guests. It had a 1-meter thick concrete ceiling and could accommodate 30 to 40 people. Hotel staff received a military training course.

During the Vietnam War, the hotel hosted many international correspondents and war reporters from communist-friendly media outlets such as L'Humanité and Shimbun Akahata, as well as Western writers and filmakers like Madeleine Riffaud and Joris Ivens. The Thống Nhất played a similar role to Saigon's Continental and Caravelle hotels as "the most civilised Western meeting point" in town.

At the end of her visit to Hanoi in July 1972, American actress and anti-war activist Jane Fonda took shelter in the hotel bunker as an American air raid commenced just before her planned departure for Gia Lam Airport.

Folk musician Joan Baez also visited Hanoi in December 1972 as a guest of the Committee for Solidarity with the American People, alongside Columbia law professor Telford Taylor, anti-war veteran Barry Romo, and the Reverend Michael Allen. The song Where Are You Now, My Son? was recorded inside the Thống Nhất Hotel's air raid bunker while Baez was sheltering from the Christmas bombings, with the sounds of explosions and anti-aircraft fire audible in the recording.

From 1969 to 1981, the Thống Nhất Hotel was nicknamed "Embassy House", being home to several embassies and UN agencies. With almost all public buildings in Hanoi undergoing reconstruction in the aftermath of severe bombing damage, the hotel accommodated diplomatic representatives from three United Nations agencies (the UNHCR, UNDP and FAO) and 11 embassies from both sides of the Cold War.

Although never hit by the bombs, by the 1970s the formerly grand hotel had fallen on hard times. Under the management of state apparatchiks, service was poor to nonexistent. Restaurant fare were of terrible quality and could take up to two hours to arrive; the rice served were full of grit, and basic omelettes were one of the few edible dishes. This led to some guests resorting to cooking their own food in their suites. Frequent power cuts made candlelight a necessity, and the entire hotel was plagued by a rat infestation so severe that a Norwegian journalist named a book chapter about his stay "The Kingdom of Rats".

1980s

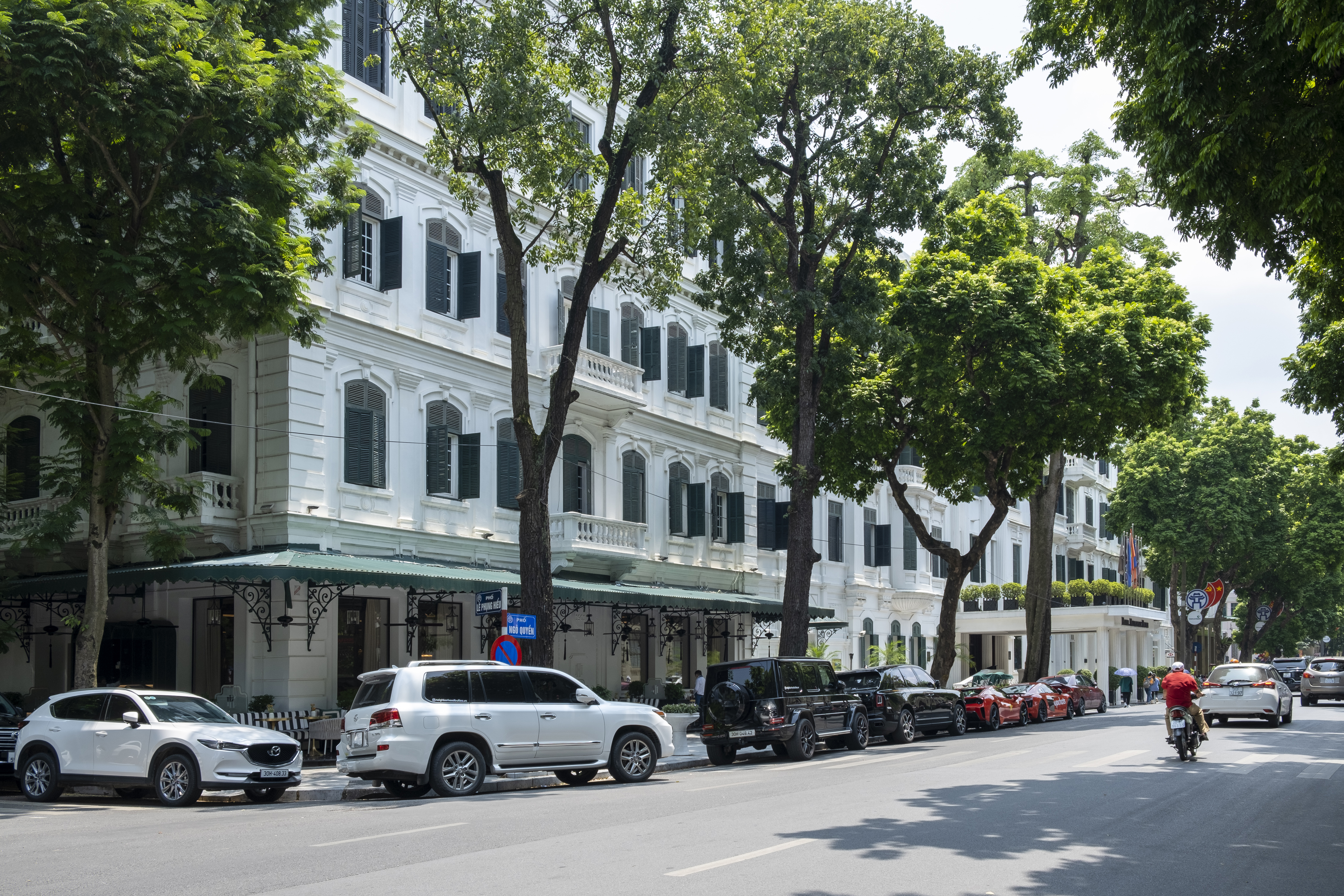
Heritage Wing, Ngô Quyền street

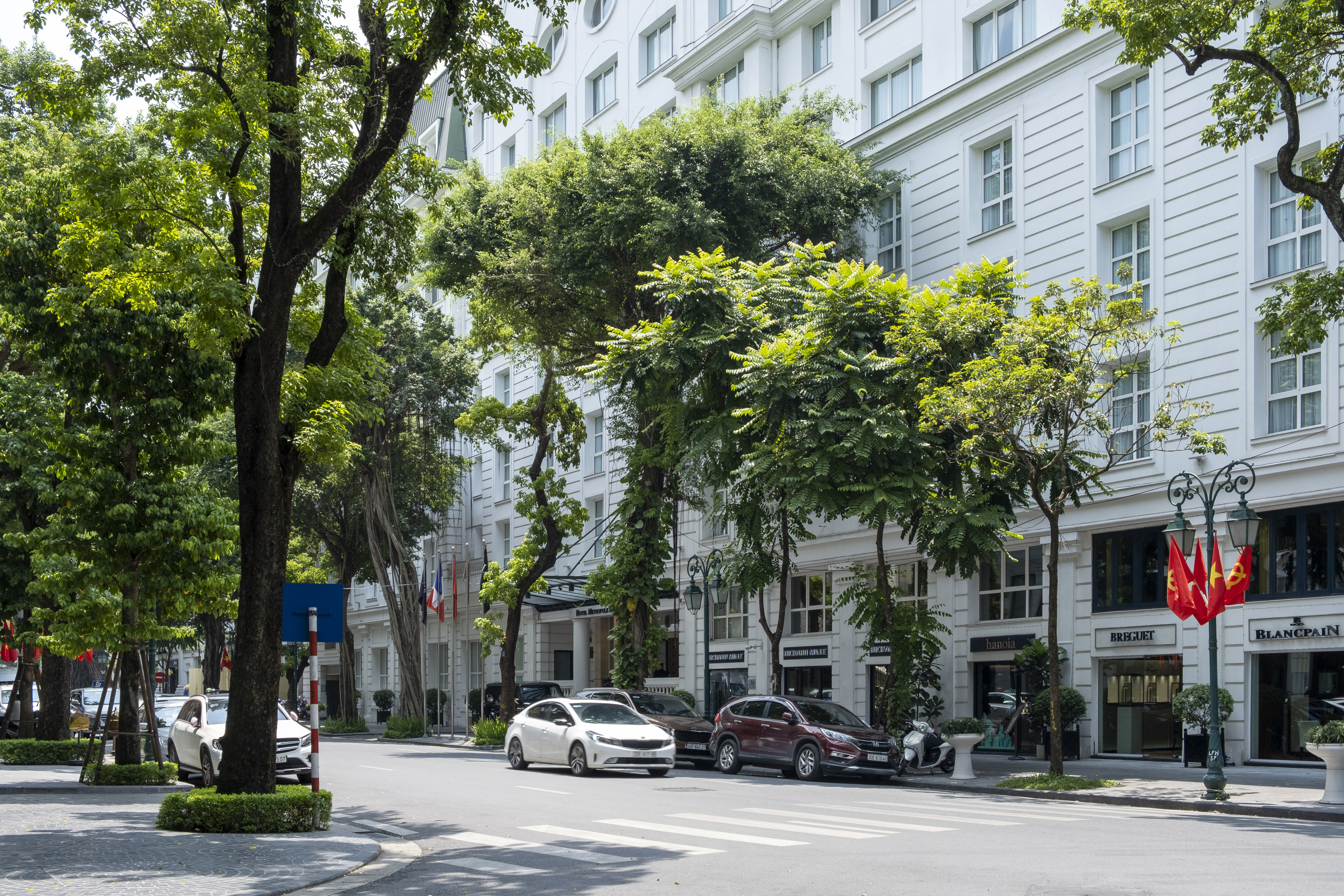
Opera Wing, Lý Thái Tổ street

After the Vietnam War ended, several ideas were evaluated to restart tourism and modernize the Thống Nhất, but these efforts did not bear fruit until the Đổi Mới economic reforms began in 1986. In 1987, the Pullman Hotels chain entered into a joint venture with the state-owned Hanoitourist travel agency to restore the hotel to international standards.

The hotel has since been under the ownership of S.E.M. Thống Nhất Metropole Hotel Company Limited, an equal joint venture between the Hanoi Tourism Corporation and the Singapore-based Indotel Limited private equity firm.

1990s

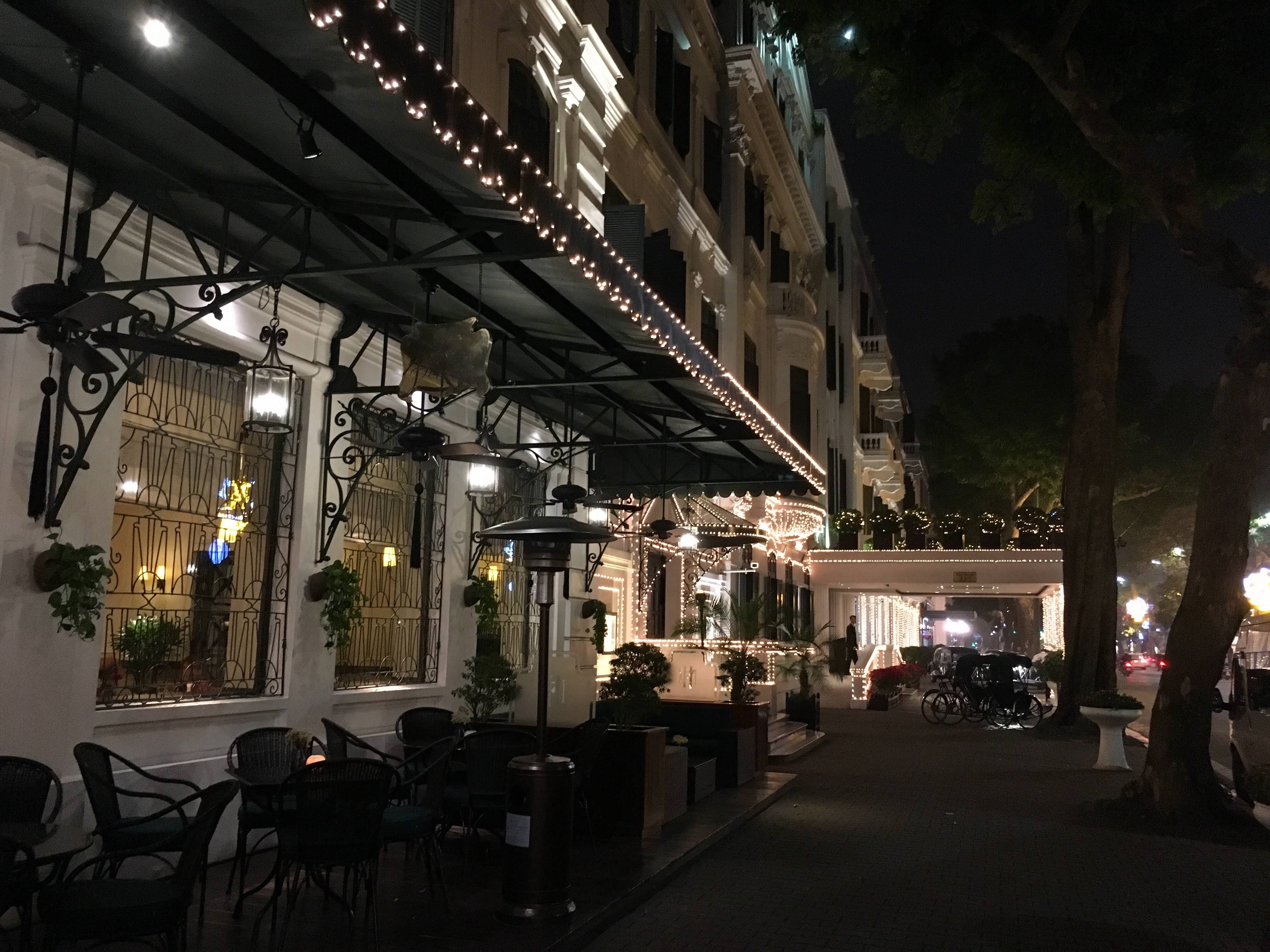
Hotel façade at night

The hotel was completely rebuilt, regaining the name Metropole and reopening on 8 March 1992, as the Pullman Hotel Metropole. The hotel was later transferred to the Sofitel chain, and finally becomes the Sofitel Legend Metropole Hanoi.

The new 135-room Opera Wing was added from 1994 to 1996, along with the Metropole Center office tower. The offices were converted to additional hotel rooms in 2008.

In 1997, a summit was held at the hotel between former senior officials on both sides of the Vietnam War, including Robert McNamara, Nicholas Katzenbach, Dale Vesser, Nguyễn Cơ Thạch, Đặng Vũ Hiệp, and Nguyễn Đình Phương. A retrospective analysis of the conflict, the meeting focused on the war's underlying causes and how both sides missed opportunities for an earlier negotiated settlement.

2000s

In 2004, major renovations restored guest rooms in the historic Metropole Wing, as well as the main entrance and the lobby. In 2006, the L'Epicerie gourmet delicatessen and La Boutique souvenir shop opens alongside the new Club Lounge. In 2009, Le Spa du Metropole is opened.

In 2011, the hotel's air raid shelter is rediscovered under the Bamboo Bar during renovation works. Blind light bulbs and yellowish painted walls survived decades of groundwater flooding. The "bunker" was restored by May 2012 and can now be toured by hotel guests and tourists.

The hotel was also used as a venue for the second meeting between US President Donald Trump and North Korean General Secretary Kim Jong Un on 27 and 28 February 2019, as part of the North Korea–United States Hanoi Summit.

In 2022, the Metropole became a quarantine hotel during the COVID-19 pandemic. At the same time, a 21-month renovation overhauled the Metropole Wing; it was reopened and rebranded in 2024 as the "Heritage Wing". The hotel marked its 125th anniversary in 2026.

== Rooms and suites ==
The hotel has 358 rooms, which are divided into two wings. The historic Heritage Wing, dating back to 1901, has 106 guest rooms inspired by classic French architecture blended with local Vietnamese styling. The contemporary Opera Wing extension was added in 1996, with its fifth to seventh floors initially housing international offices and embassies before being fully integrated into the hotel as new suites in 2006.

== Restaurants and bars ==
The hotel has three restaurants and three bars. Le Beaulieu serves contemporary French haute cuisine, Angelina serves Southern European cuisine, Spice Garden serves authentic Vietnamese cuisine, and Le Club Bar serves a mixed international menu in addition to its bar offerings.

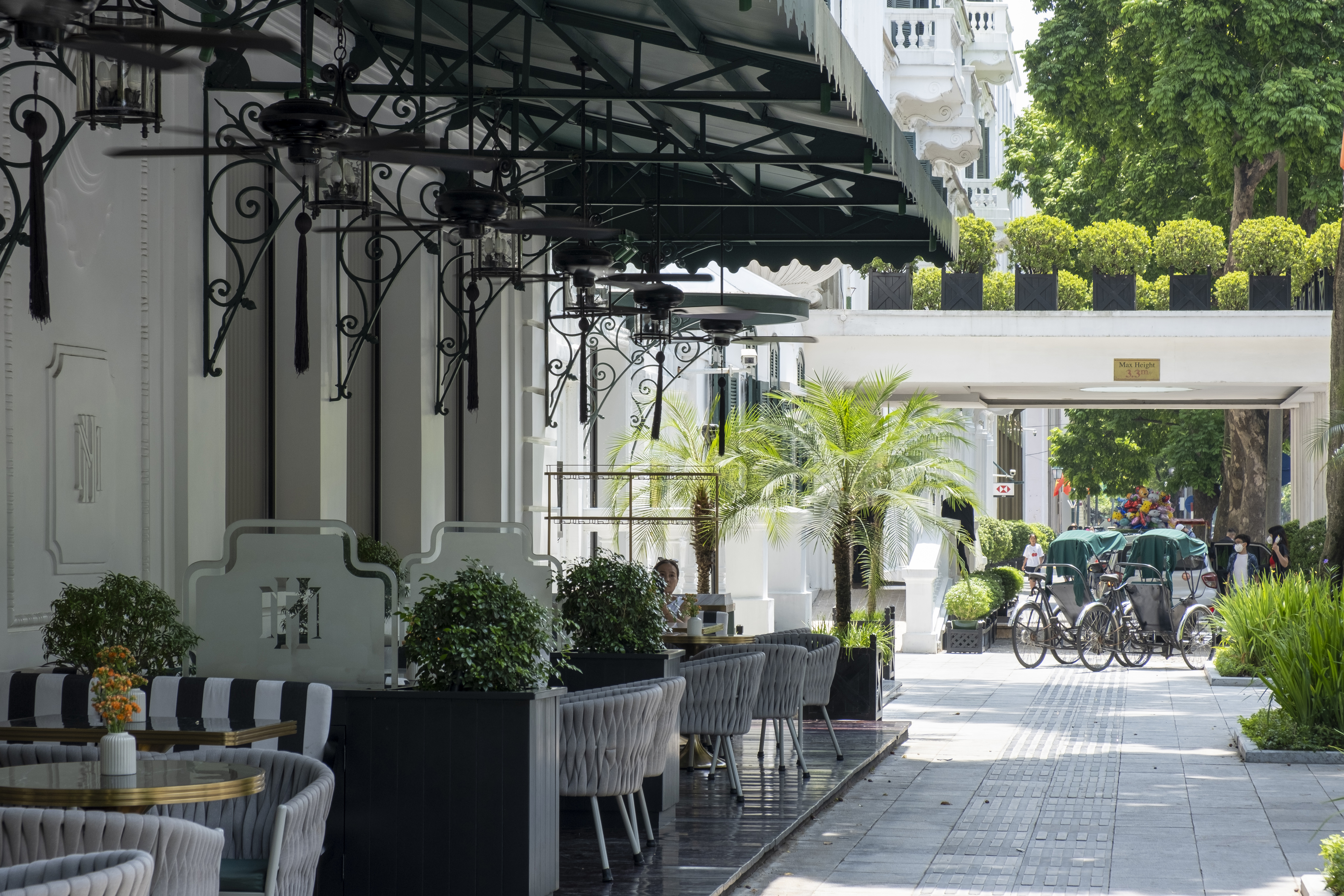
La Terrasse

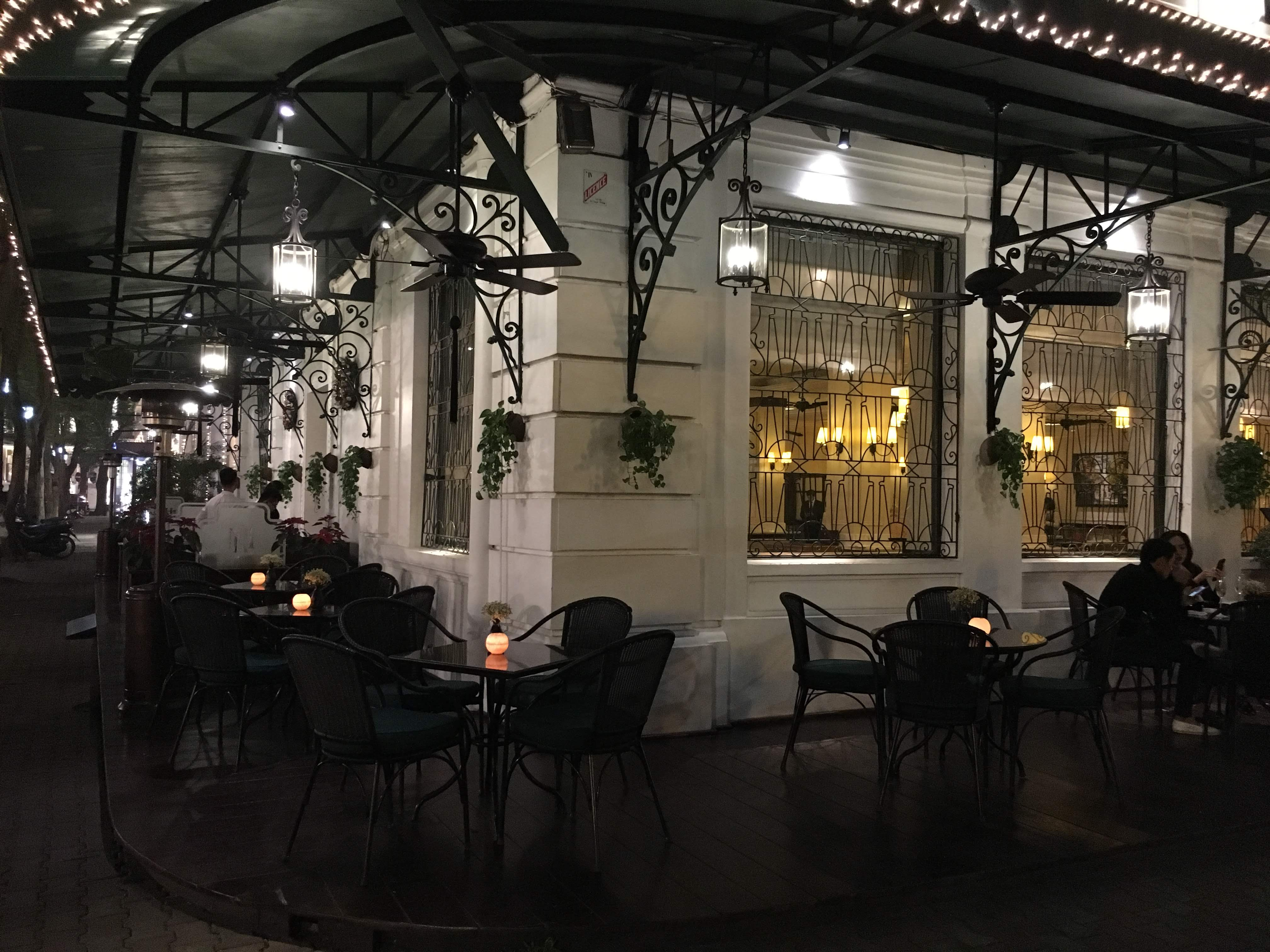
La Terrasse at night

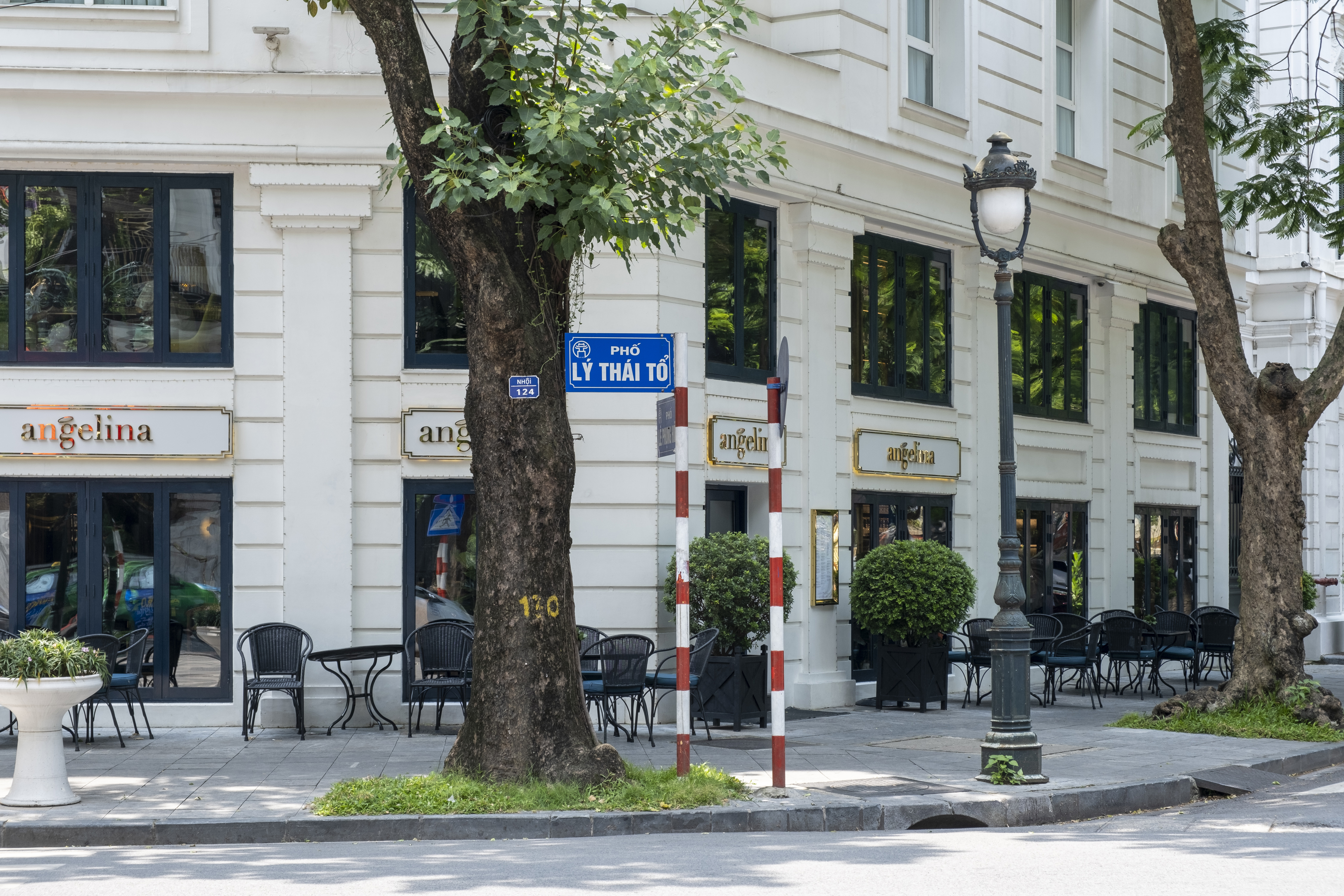
Angelina

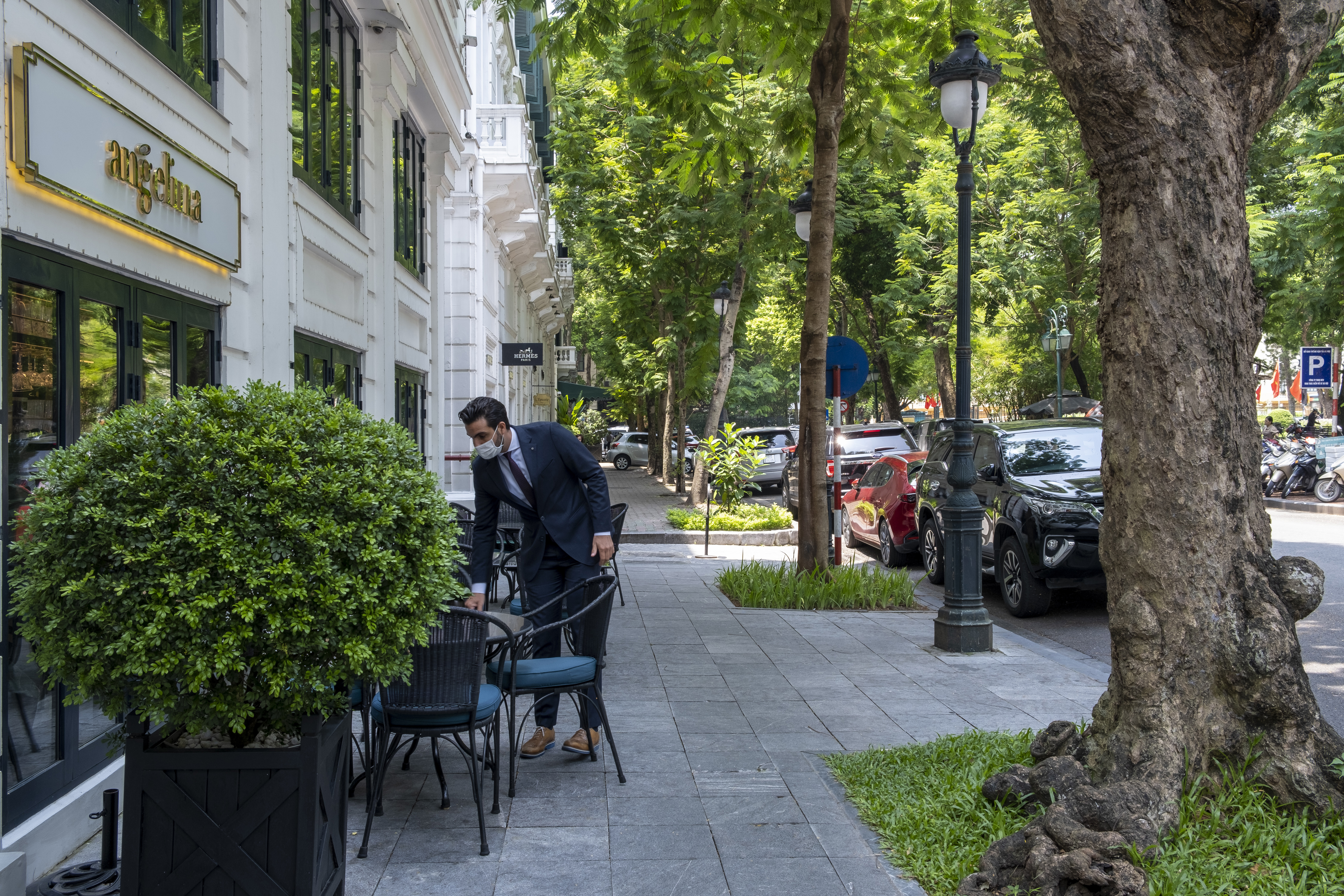
Angelina

== Metropole Arcade ==
Chopard boutique next to gate

Metropole Arcade is a high-end luxury shopping area with boutiques inside, located inside the hotel premises to the right of the Ngô Quyền Street front entrance, featuring: Blancpain, Bottega Veneta, Breitling, Breguet, Buccellati, Chopard, IWC, Jaquet Droz, Patek Philippe, and S&S Watches & Jewelry Hanoi. There is also an ATM of HSBC bank next to the Patek Philippe boutique.

== Notable residents and guests ==
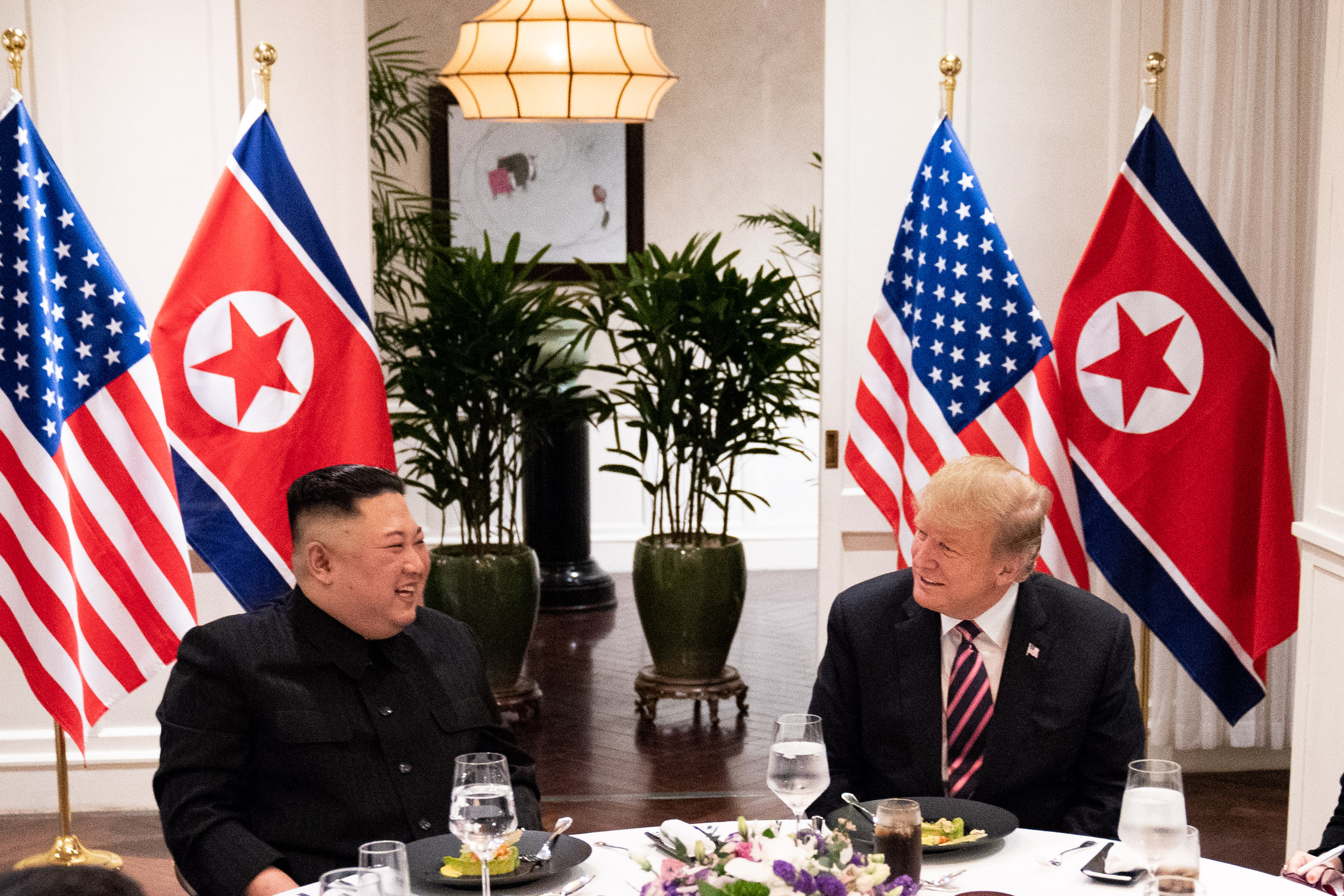
The 2019 North Korea–United States Hanoi Summit meeting at the hotel between Donald Trump and Kim Jong Un

- Writers: Somerset Maugham and Graham Greene
- Politicians:
  - François Mitterrand, Jacques Chirac, François Hollande, George H. W. Bush, Bill Clinton, Vladimir Putin, Fidel Castro, John Kerry, John McCain, Michael D. Higgins, Ban Ki-moon, Erna Solberg, Queen Máxima of the Netherlands, Emmanuel Macron during state visits
  - Donald Trump and Kim Jong-un (not staying guests, the hotel was the meeting place for the 2019 Hanoi Summit)
- Actors:
  - Charlie Chaplin and Paulette Goddard on their honeymoon
  - Jane Fonda during the Vietnam War
  - Robert De Niro, Catherine Deneuve, Michael Caine
- Singer Joan Baez during the Vietnam War

== Managers ==
- 1901: Edouard Lion
- 1905: Perrichel
- 1933: Jean Boeuf
- 1934: Paul Varenne-Caillard
- 1936: Brunelière
- 1940: Louis Blouet
- 1942: Jean Melandré
- 1946: Giu Sinh Hoi
- 1954: Cam
- 1955: Luu Dinh Dien
- 1969–1972: Luu Thien Ly
- 1991: Ricardo Perran
- 1996: Richard Kaldor
- 2000: Franck Lafourcade
- 2005: Philippe Bissig
- 2005: Gilles Cretallaz
- 2008: Kai Speth
- 2013: Franck Lafourcade
- 2017: William Haandrikman
- 2023: George Koumendakos

== Literature ==
- Augustin, Andreas, The History of Hotel Metropole Hanoi (1998); 160 pages, Classic Edition: The Most Famous Hotels in the World
- Augustin, Andreas, The Amazing Tale of the Fabulous Hotel Metropole – the Sofitel Legend of Hanoi (2025) ISBN 978-3-900692-21-6
- William Warren, Jill Gocher (2007). Asia's Legendary Hotels: The Romance of Travel. Singapore: Periplus Editions. ISBN 978-0-7946-0174-4.

== Gallery ==
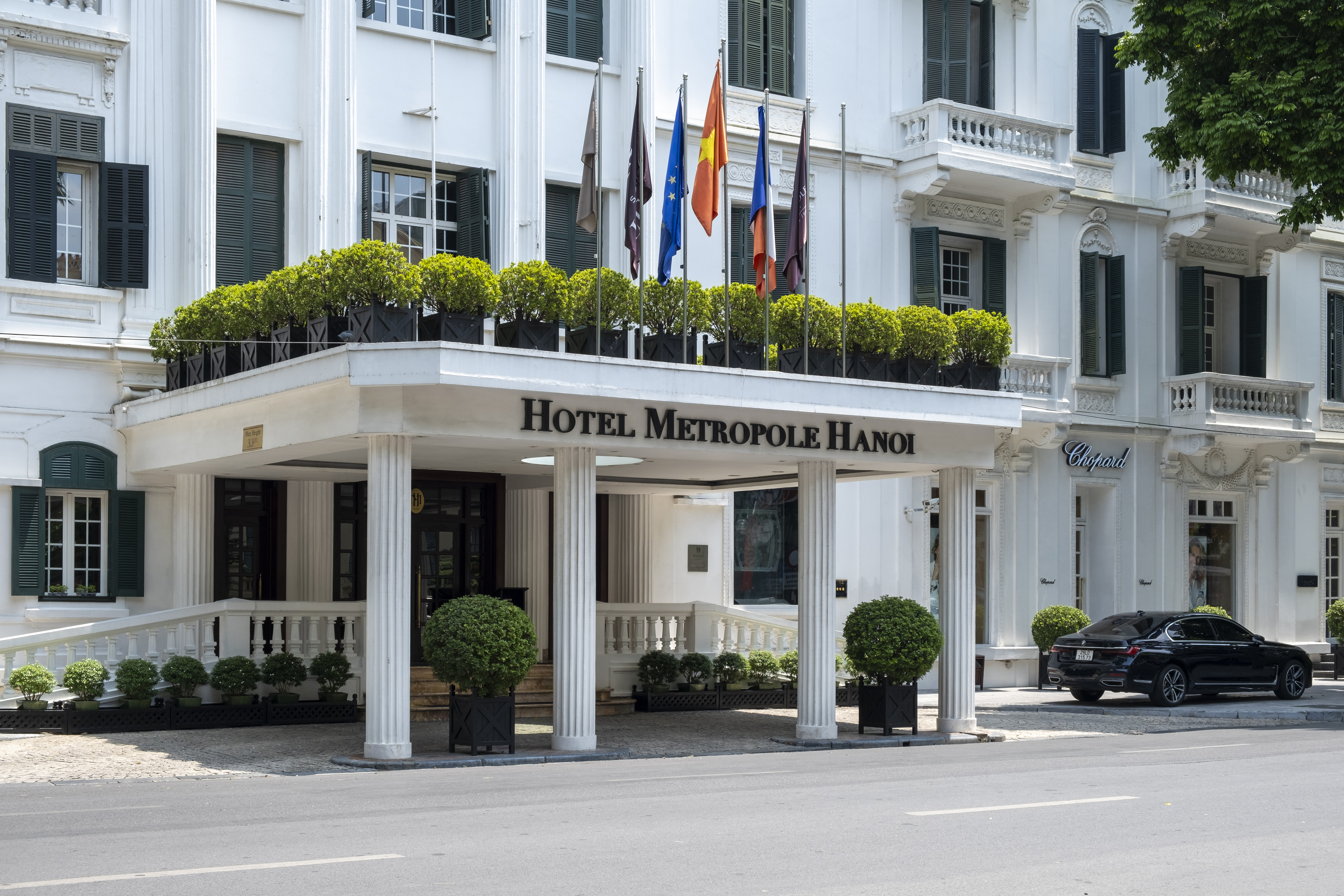
Front entrance, 15 Ngô Quyền Street

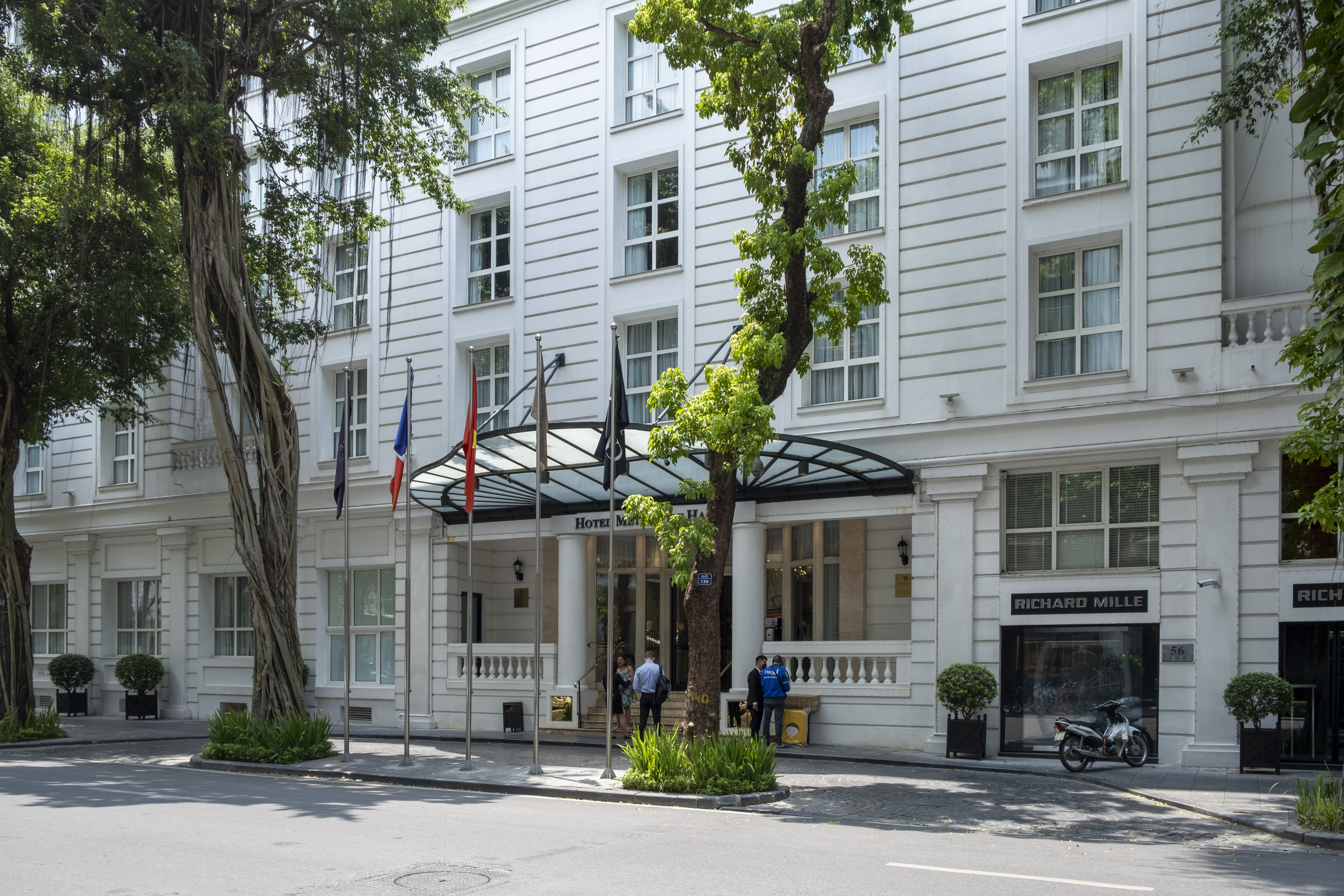
Rear entrance, 56 Lý Thái Tổ Street

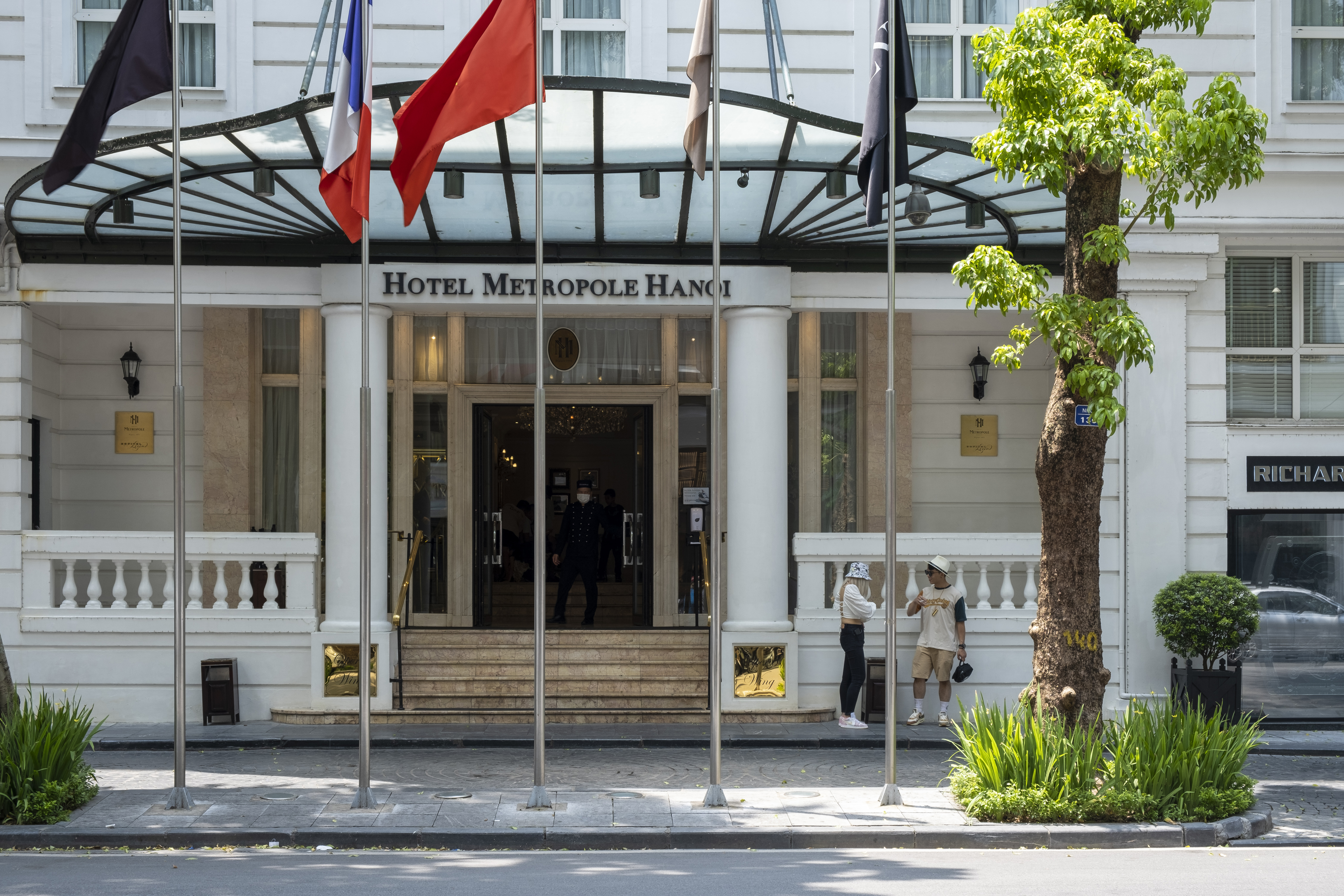
Rear entrance, 56 Lý Thái Tổ Street

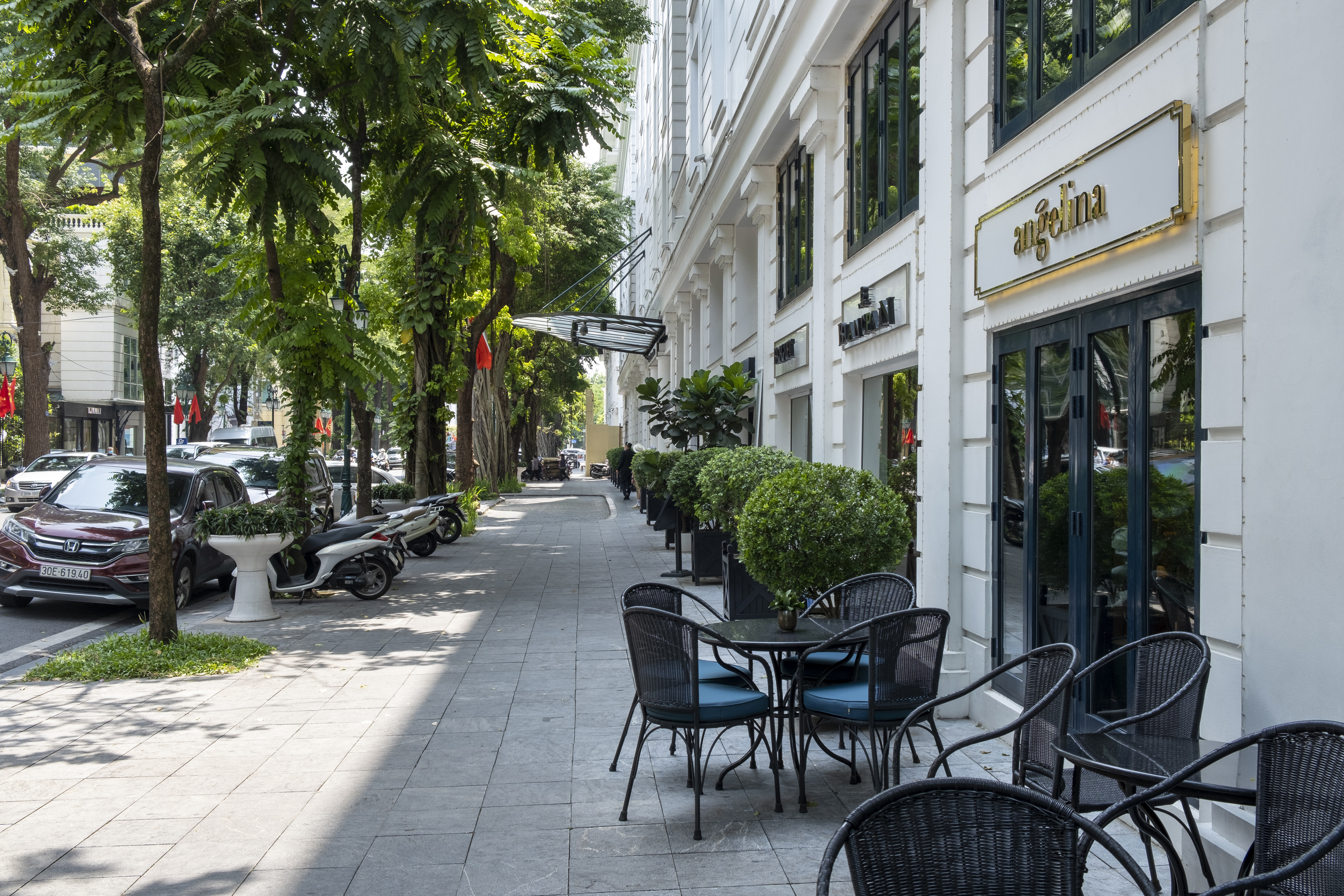
Angelina bar, 56 Lý Thái Tổ Street

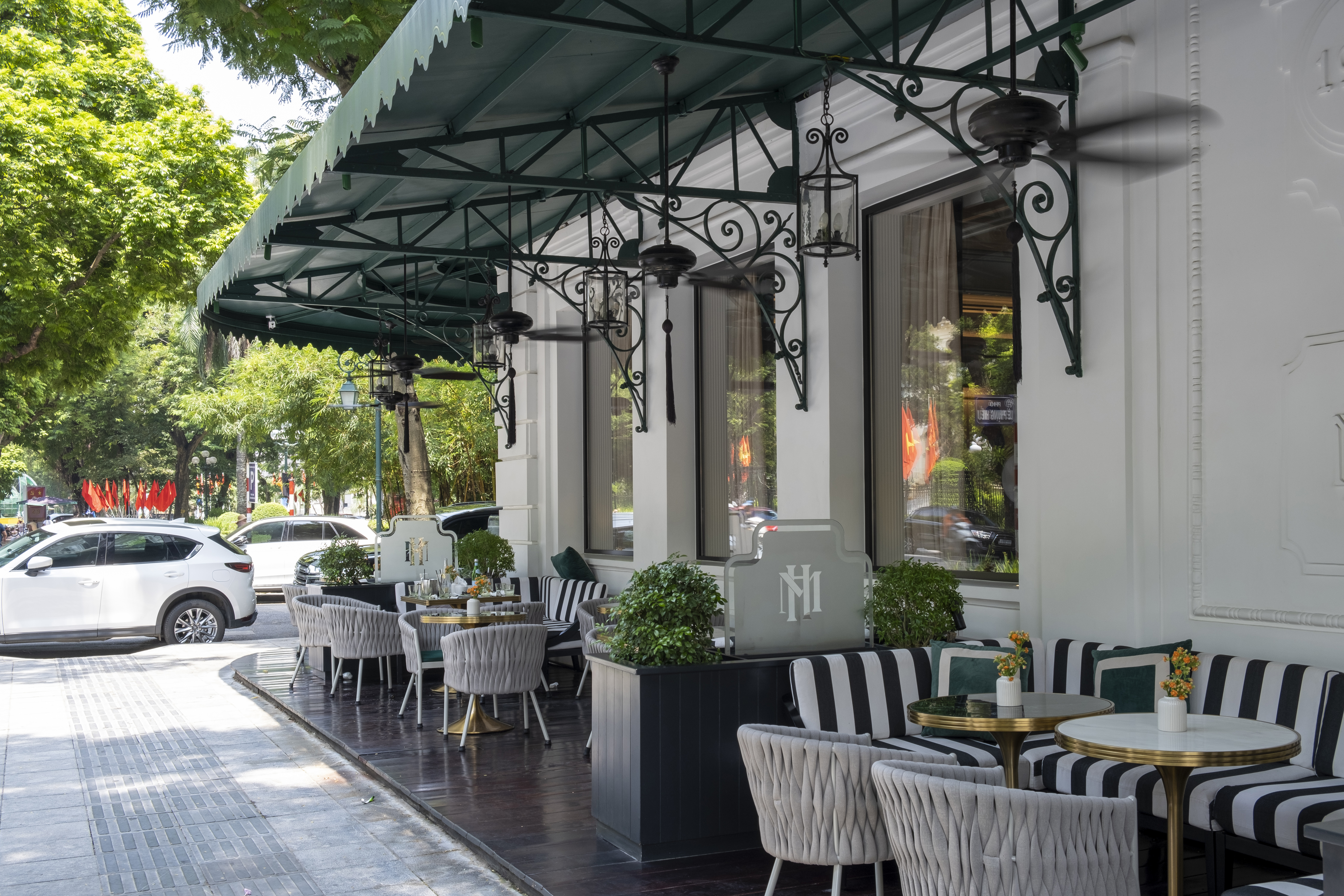
La Terrasse café, Lê Phụng Hiểu Street

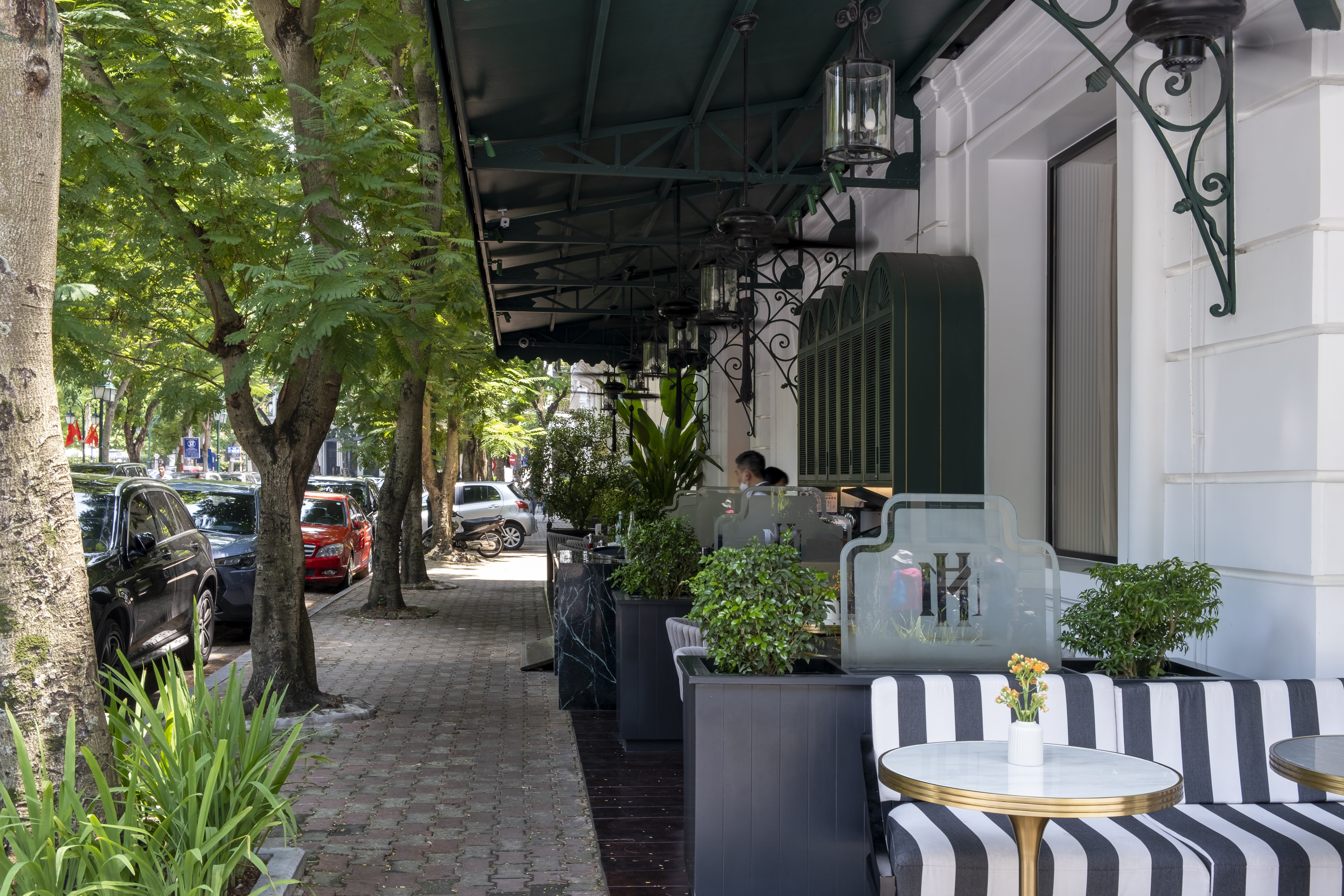
La Terrasse café, 13 Lê Phụng Hiểu Street

Hotel opening year is engraved on the façade
