= The Westin Paris – Vendôme =

Hotel in Paris

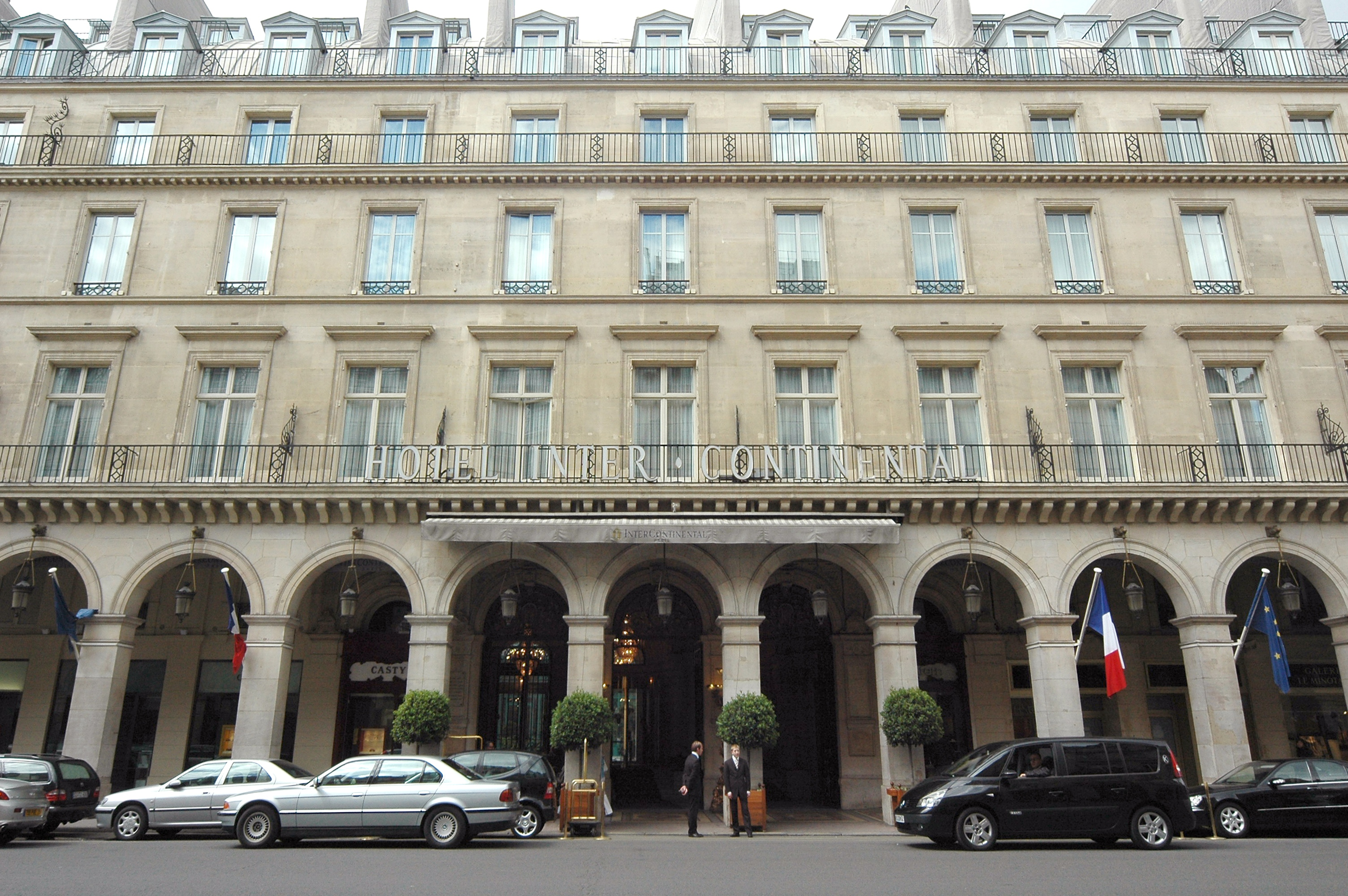
- The hotel in 2005, before it was renamed The Westin

- Location within Paris

General information
- Location: 3, Rue de Castiglione, Paris, France
- Coordinates: 48°52′15″N 2°19′51″E
- Opening: April 1878
- Owner: Dubai Holding
- Management: Westin Hotels

Technical details
- Floor count: 5

Other information
- Number of rooms: 440
- Number of restaurants: 2

The Westin Paris – Vendôme was a historic hotel in Paris, France at 3 rue de Castiglione on the corner of the rue de Rivoli, facing the Tuileries Garden. It opened in 1878 and closed for major renovations in 2025.

== History ==
The Hôtel Continental was constructed to house tourists visiting the 1878 Paris Exposition and opened on June 6, 1878. It was designed by Charles Garnier's son-in-law Henri Blondel and was intended to be the most luxurious hotel in Paris at the time. It occupied a full block, the former site of the Ministry of Finance, designed by François-Hippolyte Destailleur in 1817, following the Bourbon Restoration and burned down during the Paris Commune in 1871. During the first World War the hotel was used as a military hospital. The Hôtel Continental remained the largest hotel in Paris for decades; the Russian Grand Dukes habitually stayed there.

With the outbreak of World War II in 1939, the hotel was taken over by the Ministry of Information as its headquarters and housed the offices of Minister of Information Ludovic-Oscar Frossard in its former Imperial Suite, which once hosted Empress Eugénie. On June 14, 1940, the hotel was requisitioned by the occupying German military and served as offices. Upon the Liberation of Paris in 1944, bedsheets were hung from the hotel's windows as white flags of surrender. The building was used to house French troops until 1947, when the Hotel Continental reopened.

The hotel was bought by Pan Am's Inter-Continental Hotels division in August 1968 and fully renovated at a cost of $8 million. It was renamed the Inter-Continental Paris and opened its first 137 updated rooms on May 26, 1969, with the remainder of its 530 rooms following in 1970. The hotel was the site of a bombing on August 30, 1981 that injured 18 people and damaged the foyer and restaurant on the ground floor. The bomb was in an attache case and police theorized it might have exploded prematurely, as there were no claims of responsibility.

Singapore-based sovereign wealth fund GIC bought the hotel from the UK-based InterContinental Hotels Group on September 8, 2005, for €315 million. GIC selected Starwood Hotels to assume management of the property, and it was renamed The Westin Paris on October 10, 2005, adding the suffix Vendôme to its name in 2010.

GIC sold the hotel to London-based Henderson Park Capital in 2017 for €550 million. The new owners announced that the hotel would be renovated at a cost of $350 million by designer Tristan Auer and would become part of Jumeirah Hotels & Resorts in 2022. The renovation and reflagging did not happen. In 2018, Dubai Holding, the personal investment portfolio of Dubai ruler Sheikh Mohammed bin Rashid Al Maktoum, bought a minority stake in the hotel. Henderson Park put the hotel up for sale in February 2022, for €800 million. In March 2023, Dubai Holding bought out Henderson Park's controlling stake in the hotel for €650 million and announced that the hotel would remain open under Westin management through the 2024 Paris Olympics. The Westin Paris – Vendôme closed on April 27, 2025. Its furniture and fittings were auctioned off on May 6, 2025. It is to be renovated into a five-star hotel, at a cost of €1 billion, with reopening planned for 2028.

Hôtel Continental, on the left, in 1900

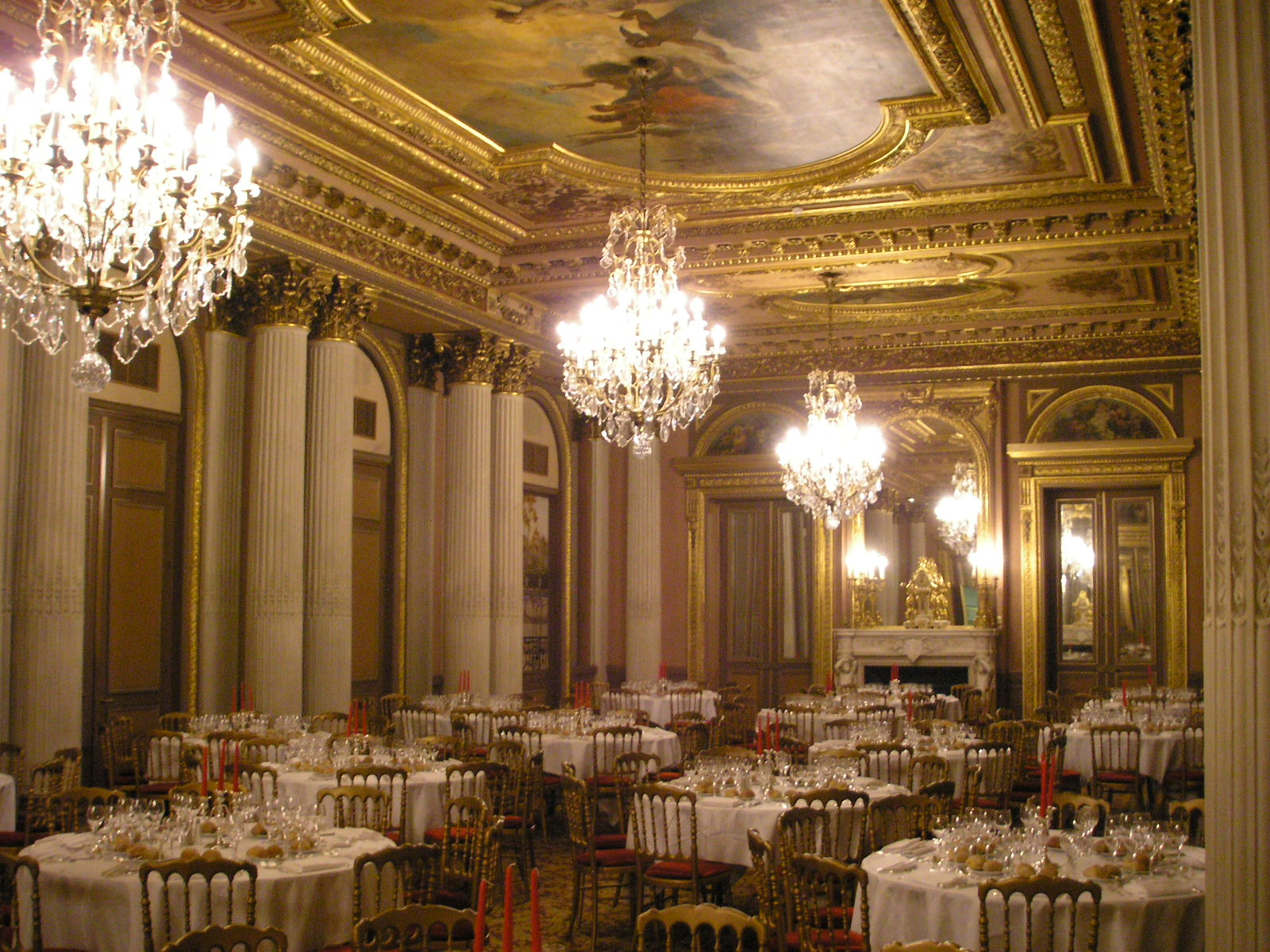
A ballroom in The Westin

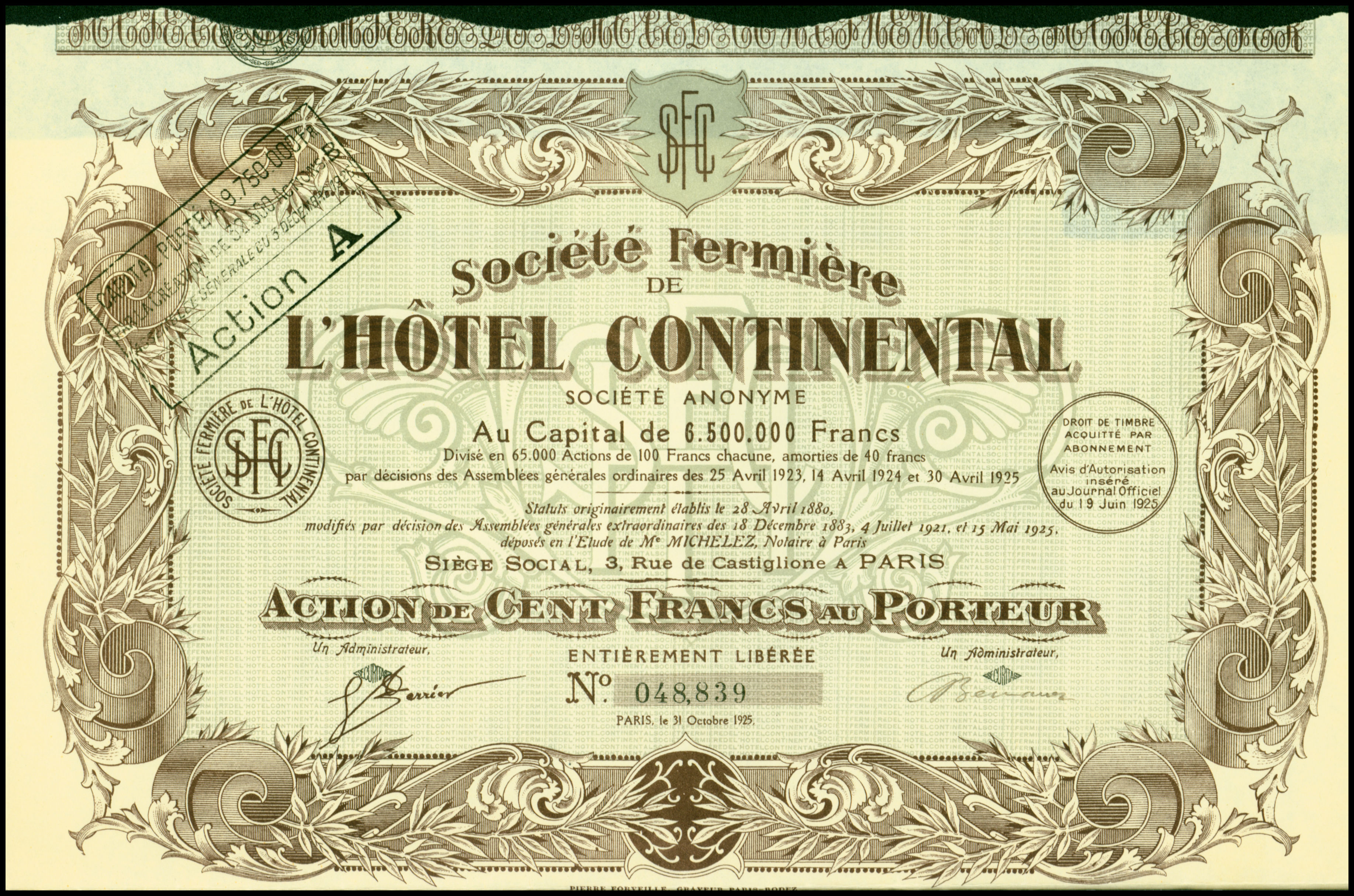
Share of the L'Hôtel Continental S. A., issued 31. October 1925
