= Saigon Bridge =

Saigon Bridge Cầu Sài Gòn
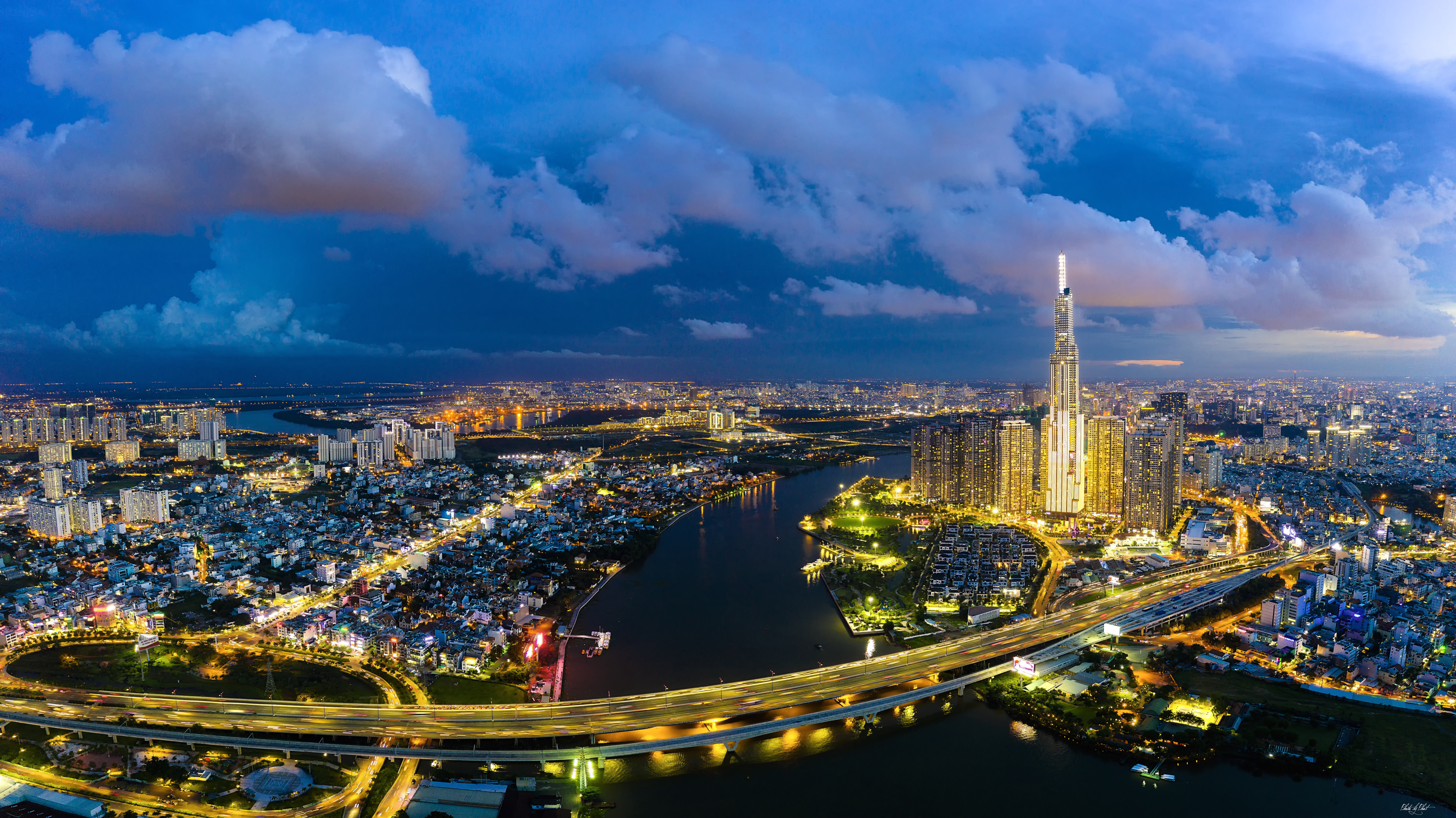
- Saigon Bridge and the nearby skyscraper Landmark 81
- Coordinates: 10°47′56″N 106°43′38″E
- Crosses: Saigon River
- Locale: Ho Chi Minh City, Vietnam
- Other name: Newport Bridge

Characteristics
- Material: Concrete
- Total length: 1,010 metres (3,310 ft)
- Width: 26 metres (85 ft)

History
- Designer: Drake and Piper Johnson
- Opened: June 28, 1961

Location
- Interactive map of Saigon Bridge

Saigon Bridge, also known as Newport Bridge (Cầu Tân Cảng) before 1975, is a bridge crossing the Saigon River, connecting Bình Thạnh District and District 2, Ho Chi Minh City now is Thủ Đức, on the Hanoi Highway. The bridge has four lanes for cars and two lanes for motorcycles and bicycles. It was the only bridge linking District 1 to the new Thu Thiem New Urban Area in District 2 until the inauguration of Thủ Thiêm Bridge in 2008 and the Saigon River Tunnel in 2011. The bridge is one of the eastern gateway of the city and was also one of the most vital gateways for vehicles traveling from northern and central Vietnam to the city, and therefore was a key point of contention during the Tet Offensive in 1968 and the Fall of Saigon in 1975. In 2013, a new parallel bridge, Saigon 2 Bridge, was inaugurated to ease congestion on the bridge.

== History ==
Bridge construction began in 1959 as part of the Saigon-Bien Hoa Highway project. The highway was formally opened on 28 June 1961.

=== Vietnam War ===
On 5 May 1968 during the May or "mini-Tet" Offensive, a 300-man Vietcong (VC) regiment attacked the bridge and the adjacent Newport dock facility but were driven off by Army of the Republic of Vietnam (ARVN) forces. On the morning of 12 May VC gunners from the 4th Thu Duc Battalion scored a direct hit on the bridge with a recoilless rifle, sending a chunk of steel-reinforced concrete almost sixty meters long and half the width of the bridge crashing into the river. For the Allies, the damage inflicted on the bridge proved to be little more than an inconvenience. The temporary loss of one lane did not seriously impede traffic, and over the next four weeks engineers repaired the otherwise intact bridge.

By 28 April 1975 as the People's Army of Vietnam (PAVN) continued their advance on Saigon, the Vietcong seized the Thảo Điền area at the eastern end of the bridge and attempted to seize the bridge but were repulsed by the ARVN 12th Airborne Battalion. On the morning of 30 April PAVN sappers attempted to seize the bridge but were repulsed by the ARVN Airborne. At 09:00 the PAVN tank column approached the bridge and came under fire from ARVN tanks which destroyed the lead T-54, killing the PAVN Battalion commander. The ARVN and PAVN continued to exchange tank and artillery fire until 10:24, when the ARVN commander received President Dương Văn Minh's capitulation order over the radio. While the bridge was rigged with approximately 4000lbs of demolition charges, the ARVN stood down and at 10:30 the PAVN column crossed the bridge.

== Saigon 2 Bridge ==
Saigon 2 Bridge (Cầu Sài Gòn 2) is a bridge crossing the Saigon River, connecting Bình Thạnh District and District 2, Ho Chi Minh City, Vietnam, on the Hanoi Highway. It is parallel to the Saigon Bridge, being 3 metres south of it and carrying traffic in the eastern direction. Congestion on the old Saigon Bridge required increased traffic capacity, with the new bridge doubling the number of lanes, carrying another 4 lanes plus a 2 lanes for motorbikes. The cost of the bridge was 1,259,000,000,000 Vietnamese đồng. Construction started in April 2012, and the bridge was opened for traffic in October 2013.

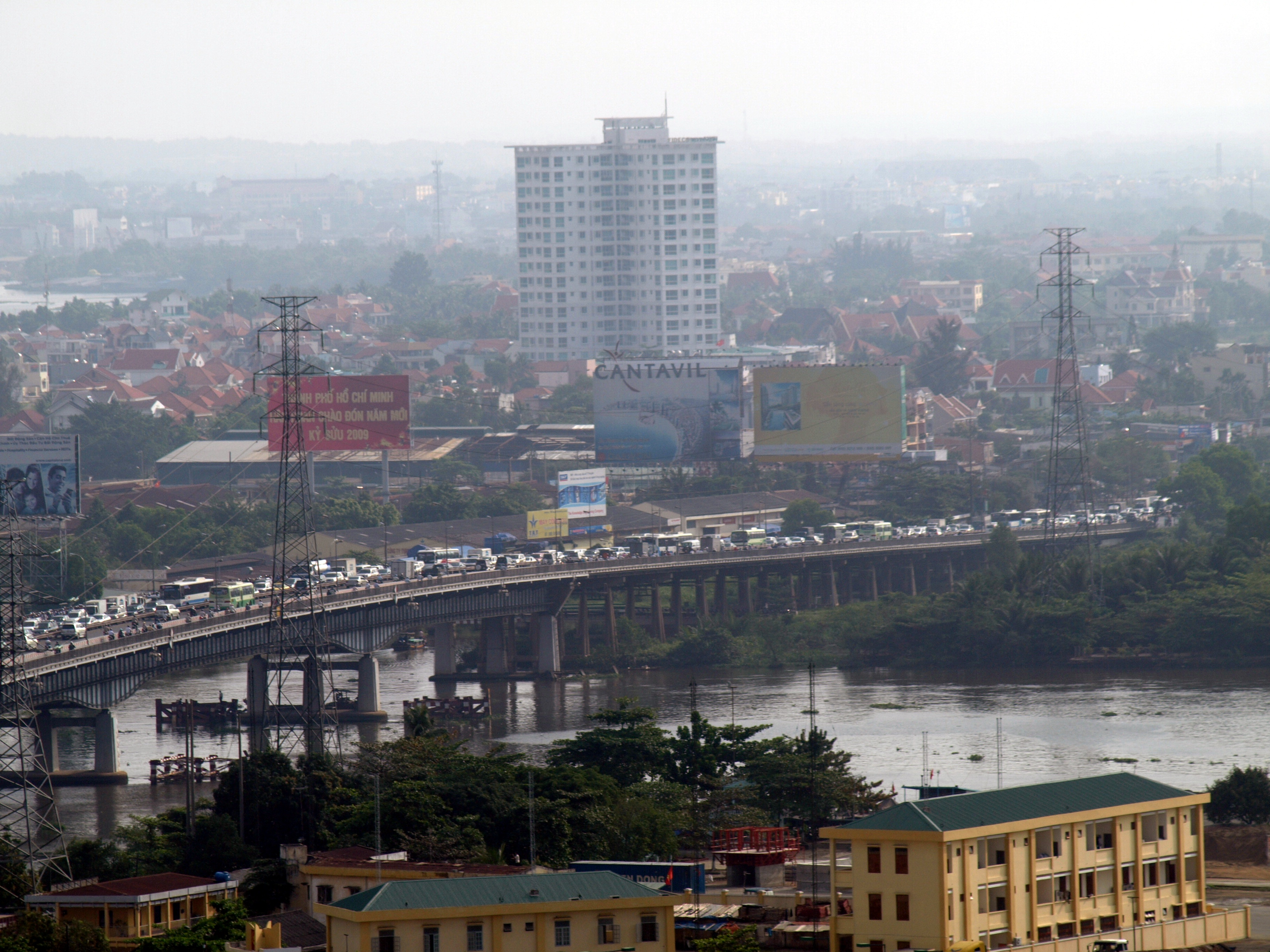
Saigon Bridge in 2009 before the expansion

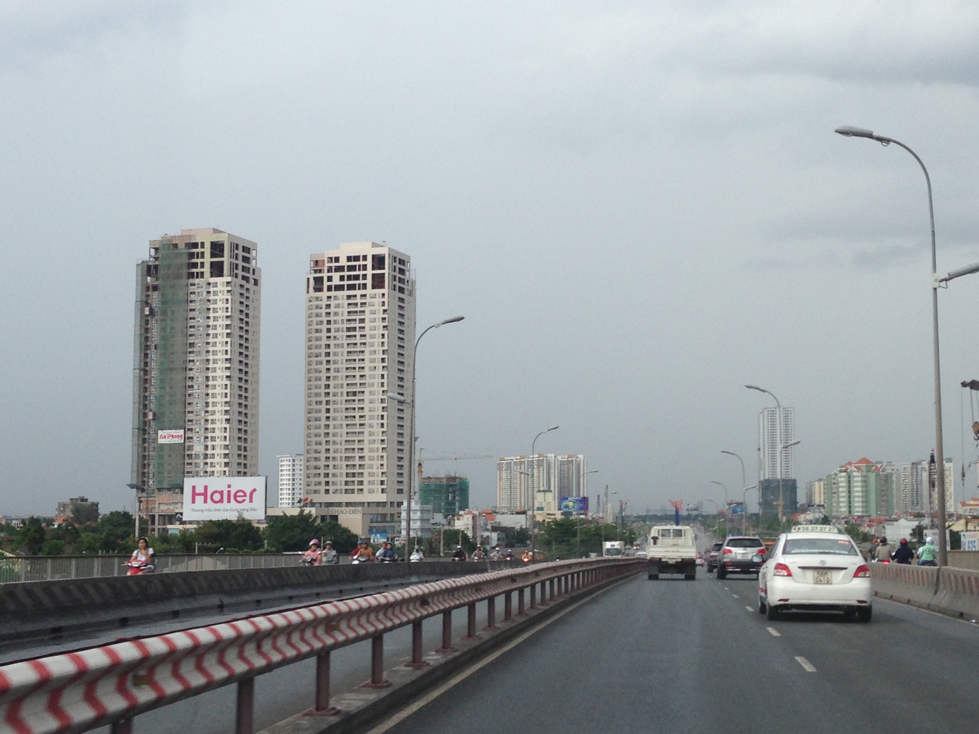
Saigon Bridge before completing the expansion in May 2013

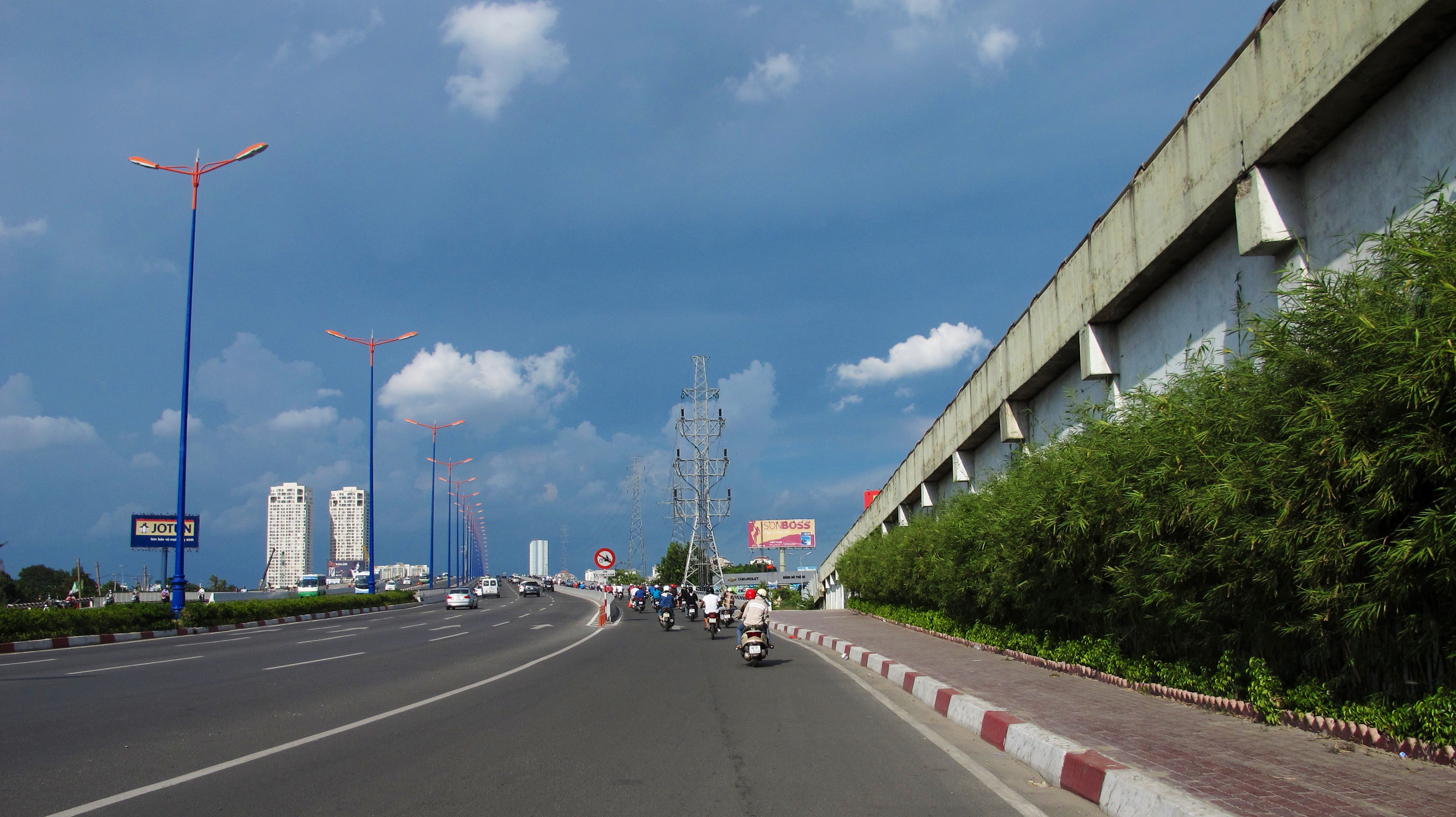
Nguyễn Hữu Cảnh Crossover Bridge next to Saigon Bridge in Bình Thạnh District
