= An Khánh, Ho Chi Minh City =

Ward in Ho Chi Minh City, Vietnam

An Khánh Phường An Khánh Thủ Thiêm, Thảo Điền
- Ward
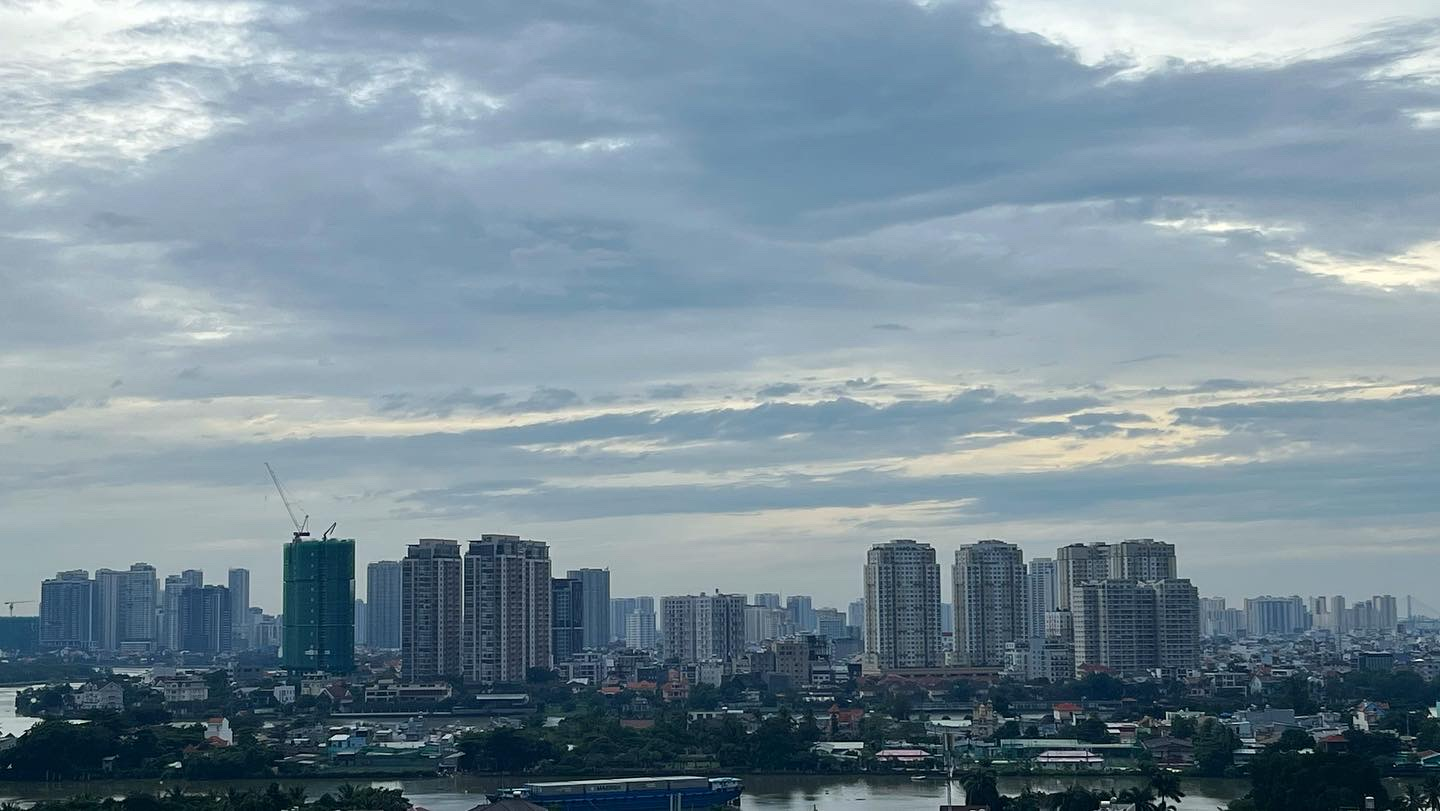
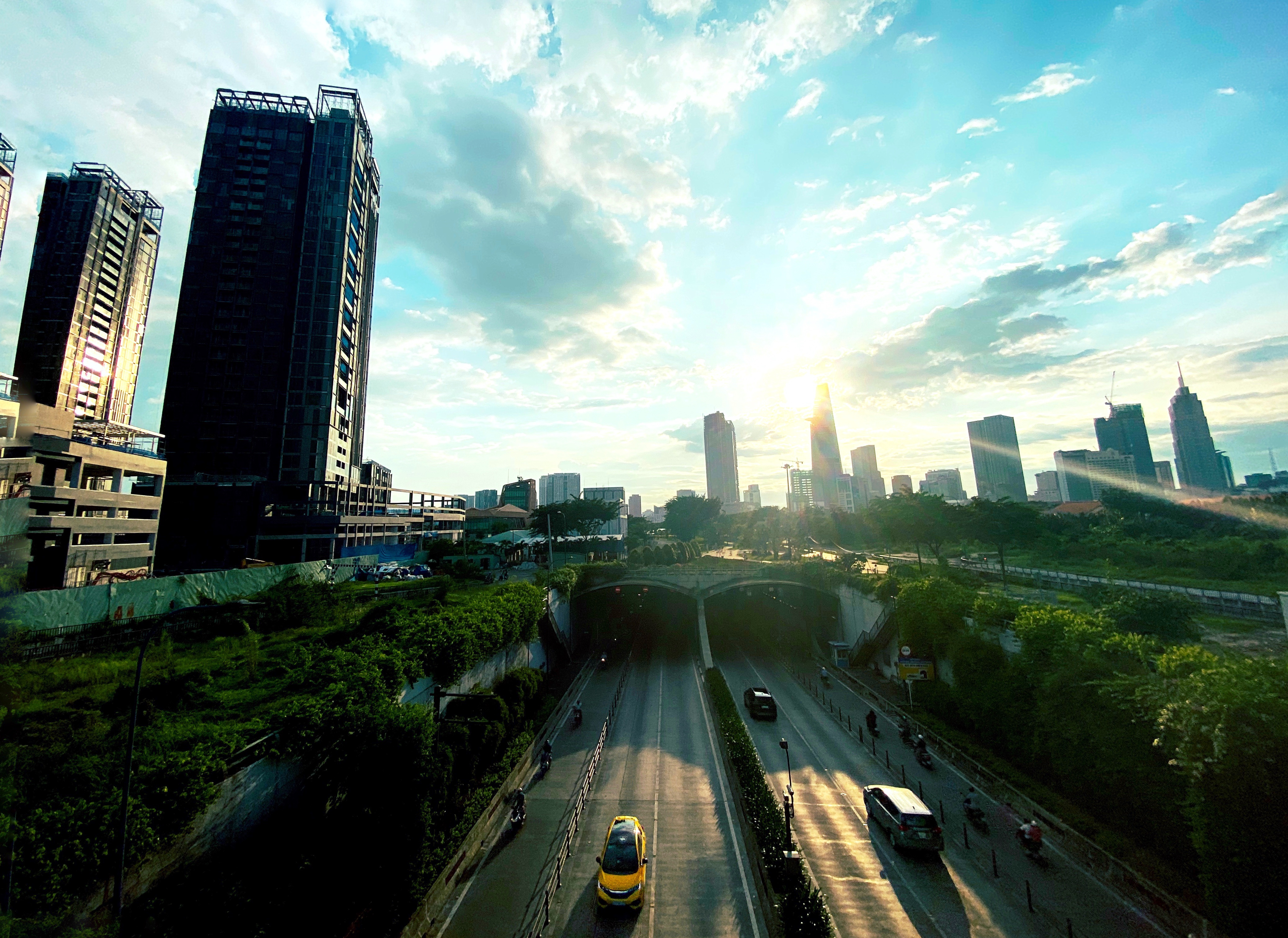
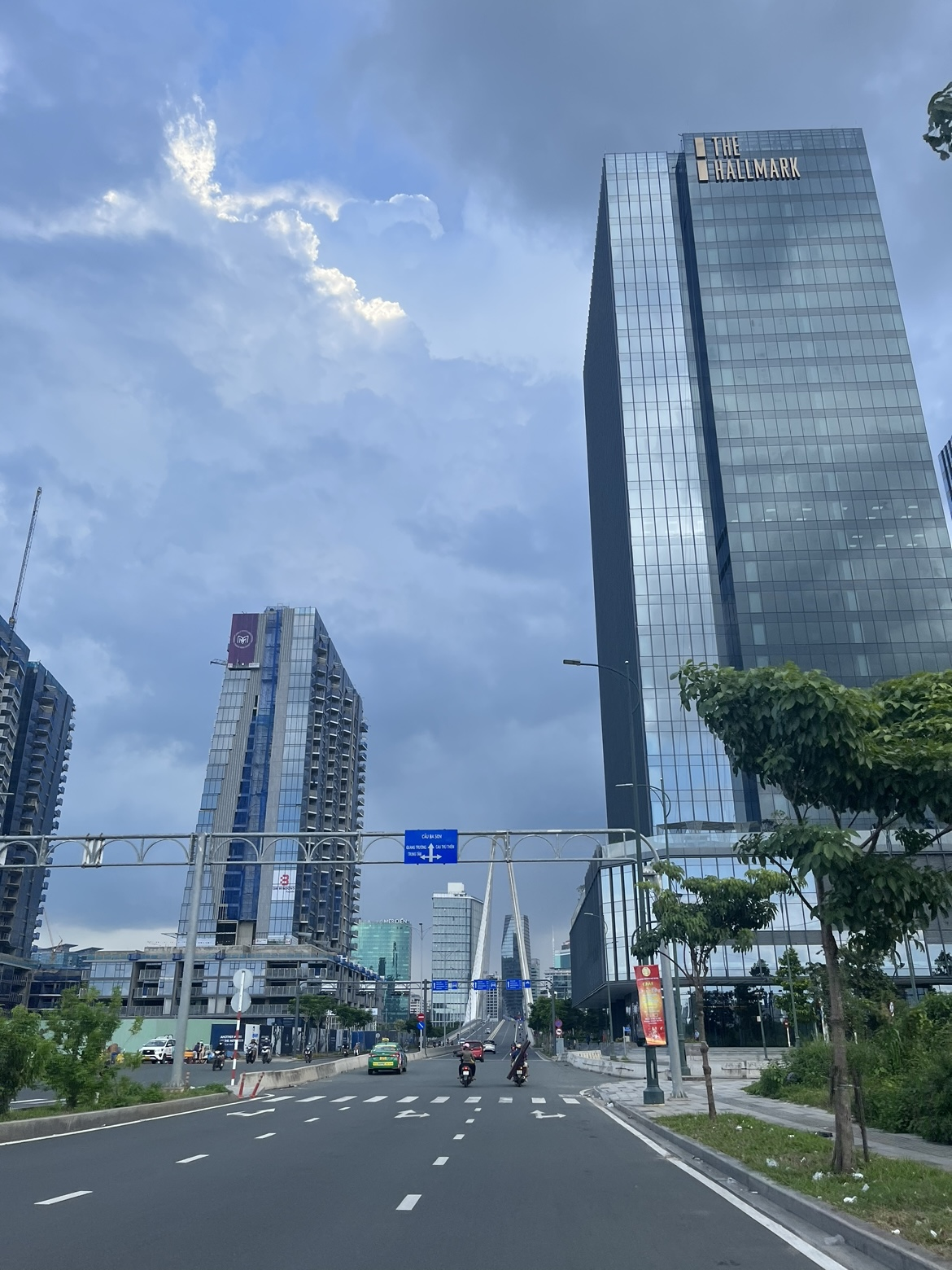
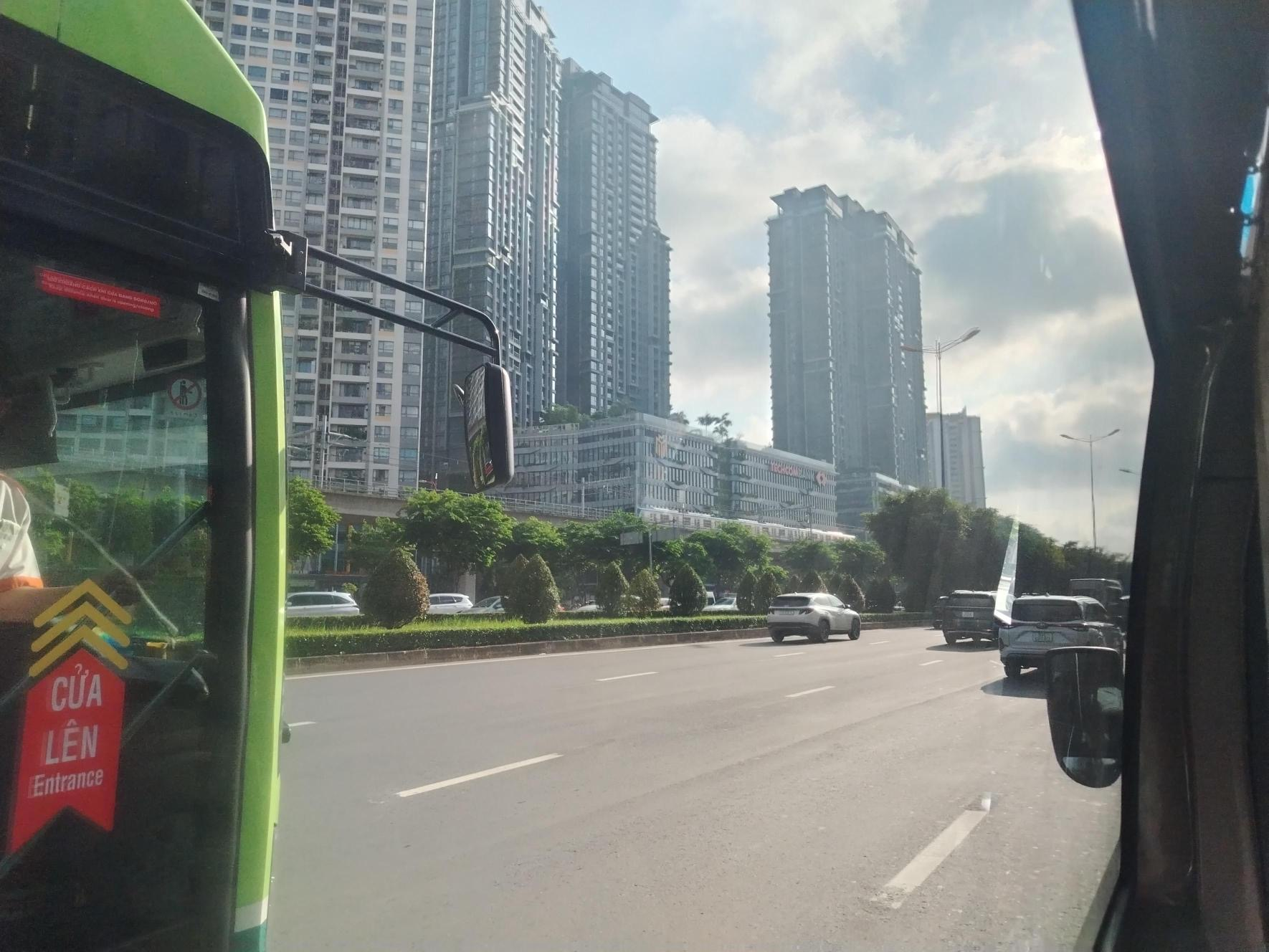
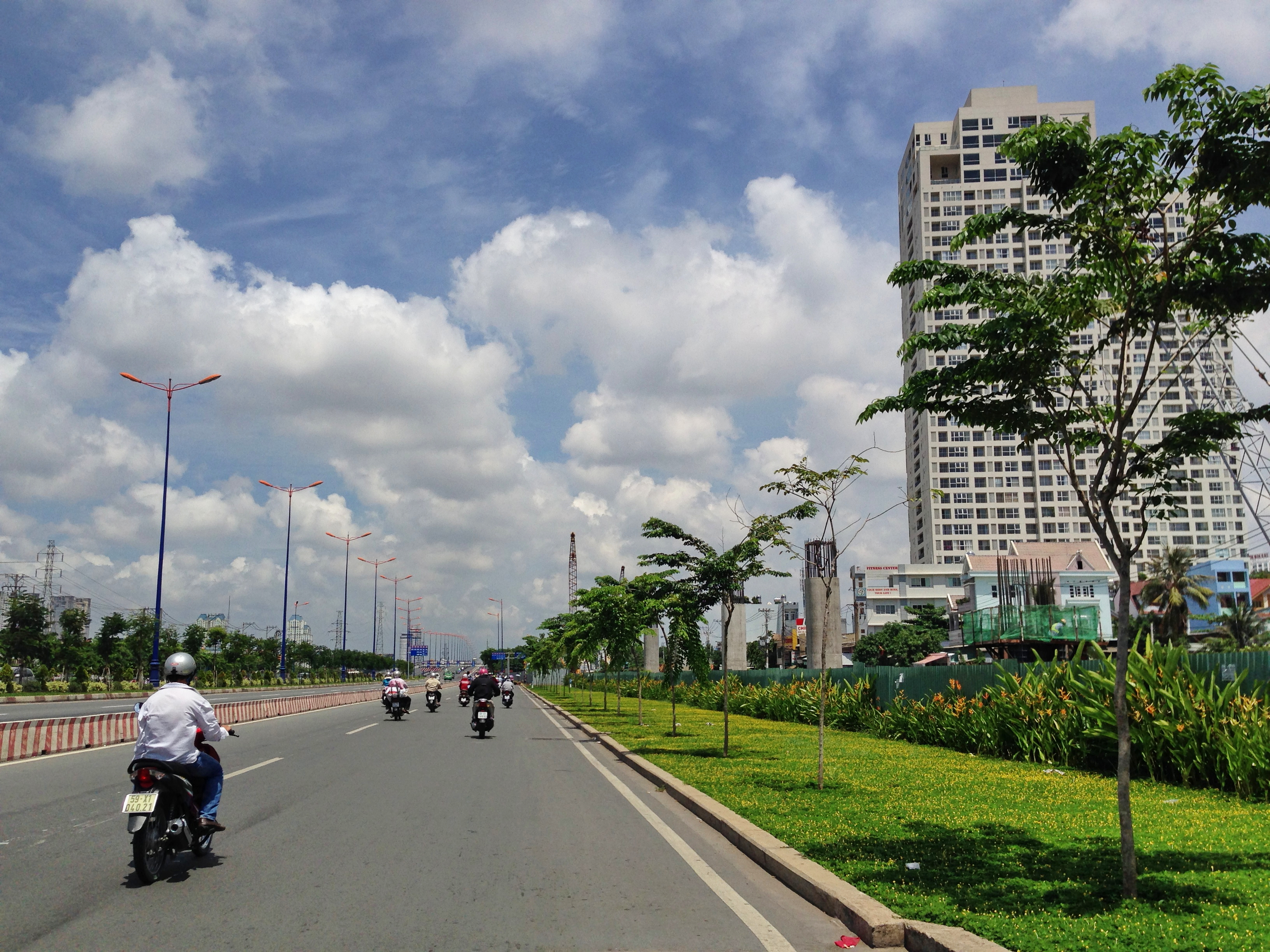
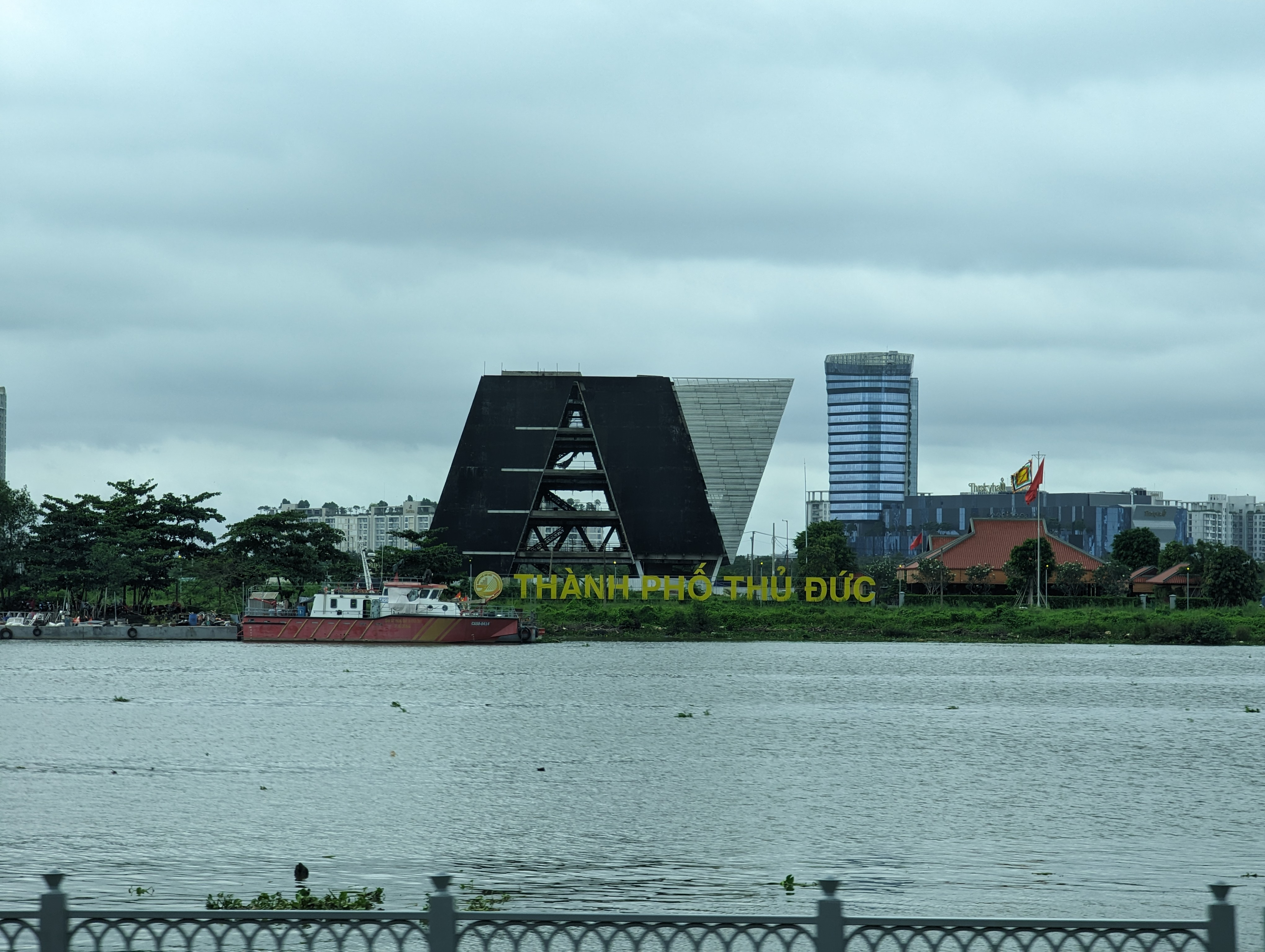
- From left to right, top to bottom: An Khánh ward skyline, Saigon River Tunnel, Thủ Thiêm new urban area, Võ Nguyên Giáp Boulevard, Hanoi Highway, Saigon River Park with An Khánh communal house
- Interactive map of An Khánh
- Coordinates: 10°47′12″N 106°43′47″E
- Country: Vietnam
- Municipality: Ho Chi Minh City
- Established: June 16, 2025

Government
  - Type: Ward-level authority

Area
  - Total: 5.92 sq mi (15.33 km^{2})

Population (2024)
  - Total: 76,967
  - Density: 13,000/sq mi (5,021/km^{2})
- Time zone: UTC+07:00 (Indochina Time)
- Postal code: 27094
- Administrative code: 27094

An Khánh (Vietnamese: Phường An Khánh) is a ward of Ho Chi Minh City, Vietnam. It is one of the 168 new wards, communes and special zones of the city following the 2025 Vietnamese administrative reforms.

== Geography ==
An Khánh is located in the center of Ho Chi Minh City, it has the following geographical location:

- To the east, it borders Bình Trưng
- To the west, it borders Saigon and Thạnh Mỹ Tây, with the border being the Saigon River.
- To the south, it borders Xóm Chiếu and Tân Thuận, with the border being the Saigon River.
- To the north, it borders Bình Quới with the border being the Saigon River, and Thủ Đức with the border being Rạch Chiếc River

According to Official Dispatch No. 2896/BNV-CQĐP dated May 27, 2025 of the Ministry of Home Affairs, following the merger, An Khánh has a land area of 15.33 km², the population as of December 31, 2024 is 76,967 people, the population density is 5,020 people/km².

The Thủ Thiêm new urban area of An Khánh ward will be joined with Bến Thành and Saigon wards to be the international financial center of Ho Chi Minh City. The new Ho Chi Minh City administrative center will also be built at the Central Lake of Thủ Thiêm quarter in the ward.

== History ==
During the Nguyễn Dynasty, the area of An Khánh ward roughly corresponded to Binh Khánh village, belonging to Bình Trị Trung commune, Bình Dương district, Tân Bình prefecture, Gia Định province.

During the French colonial period, Binh Khánh village merged with An Lợi Xã and An Lợi Đông villages to form An Khánh Xã village, which at that time belonged to An Bình commune, Thủ Đức district, Gia Định province.

After 1956, the villages were called communes. In 1966, the government of the Republic of Vietnam merged An Khánh Xã commune into the City of Saigon and divided it into two wards, An Khánh and Thủ Thiêm, belonging to District 1. However, in early 1967, An Khánh and Thủ Thiêm wards were separated again to form District 9 of Saigon.

In 1976, District 9 was dissolved, and An Khánh and Thủ Thiêm wards were merged into Thủ Đức rural district and demolished into two communes.

On January 6, 1997, the government issued Decree No. 03-CP. Accordingly:

- Transferring An Khánh commune to the newly established District 2, Ho Chi Minh City
- Established An Khánh ward based on 169 ha of area and 12.865 people of An Khánh commune.
- Established Bình Khánh ward based on 226 ha of area and 6.580 people of An Khánh commune.
- Established Bình An ward based on 169 ha of area and 6.774 people of An Khánh commune.

On December 9, 2020, the Standing Committee of the National Assembly issued Resolution 1111/NQ-UBTVQH14 on the rearrangement of district and commune-level administrative units and the establishment of Thủ Đức City in Ho Chi Minh City (the resolution takes effect from January 1, 2021).. From that:

- The city of Thủ Đức was established by merging the entire area and population of District 2, District 9, and Thủ Đức District.
- The entire area and population of An Khánh ward merged into Thủ Thiêm ward
- Established the new An Khánh ward by merging the entire area and population of Bình An và Bình Khánh wards.

On June 16, 2025, the National Assembly Standing Committee issued Resolution No. 1685/NQ-UBTVQH15 on the arrangement of commune-level administrative units of Ho Chi Minh City in 2025 (effective from June 16, 2025). Accordingly, the entire land area and population of Thủ Thiêm, An Lợi Đông, An Khánh, Thảo Điền wards and part of An Phú ward of the former Thủ Đức city will be integrated into a new ward named An Khánh (Clause 78, Article 1).

== Education ==
=== Universities ===
- University of Culture Ho Chi Minh City, Campus 1: 51 Quốc Hương Street
- University of Transports Ho Chi Minh City, Campus 2: No.10, Road 12, Trần Não Street
- Saigon International University: 2–8C–9–10–16–18 Tống Hữu Định

=== Schools ===
- International School Ho Chi Minh City, 28 Võ Trường Toản Street
- British International School Vietnam, Thảo Điền Quarter (all campuses)
- Australian International School, Vietnam – Thảo Điền Campus, APSC Compound, 36 Thảo Điền Road
- EUROPEAN International School Ho Chi Minh City, 730 F-G-K, Lê Văn Miến Street
- EtonHouse International Pre-School Franchise - An Phú, Somerset Vista, 628C Hanoi Highway
- Huỳnh Văn Ngỡi Primary School, 722 Nguyễn Đăng Giai
- Nguyễn Thị Tư Primary School, 8 Nguyễn Ư Dĩ
