= Saigon Riverside Park =

Riverside park in Ho Chi Minh City, Vietnam

- Thủ Thiêm Quay Park
- Công viên bờ sông Sài Gòn
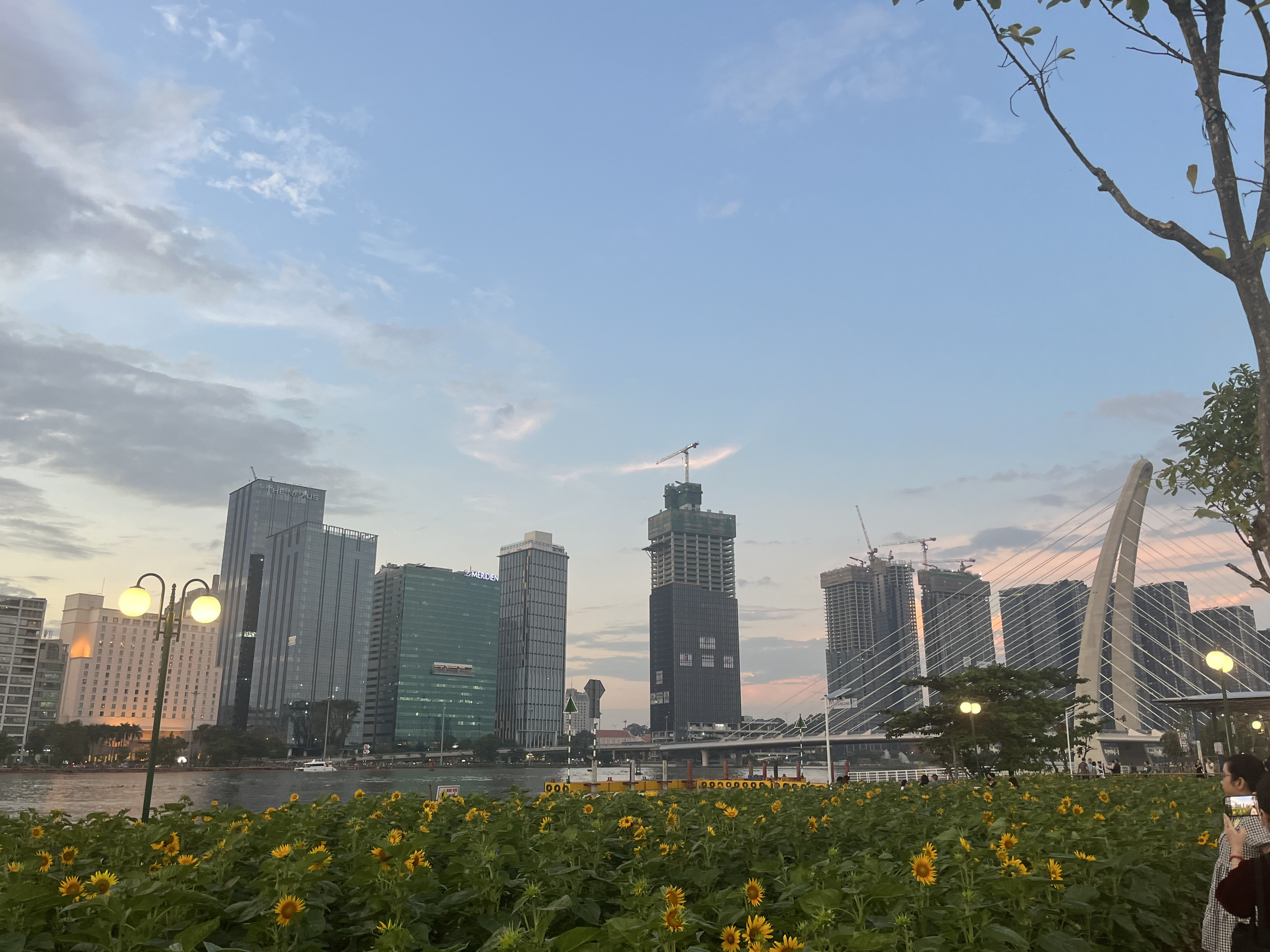
- The park, overlooking Bạch Đằng Quay
- Interactive map of Saigon Riverside Park
- Type: Urban park
- Location: Nguyễn Thiện Thành Street, Thủ Thiêm new urban area, An Khánh, Ho Chi Minh City, Vietnam
- Coordinates: 10.772908°N 106.709389°E
- Opened: 23 December 2023

Saigon Riverside Park (Vietnamese: Công viên bờ sông Sài Gòn), or Thủ Thiêm Quay Park (Công viên Bến Thủ Thiêm), is a 20 hectares (49 acres) riverside park in the Thu Thiem new urban area of An Khánh (Thủ Đức), Ho Chi Minh City, Vietnam. The park stretches along the right bank of Saigon River from the Saigon River Tunnel to Ba Son Bridge, opposite to Bạch Đằng Quay park on the left bank. The extended section from the Ba Son Bridge to the Thu Thiem Bridge is called Creative Park (Công viên Sáng Tạo).

An area of the park in front of The Opera Residences Tower, next to Ba Son Bridge is a planned new Opera House of the city and under construction Ho Chi Minh City Planning Exhibition Center.

== History ==
The place where is the park now was a boat quay, then ferry terminal called as Thủ Thiêm Quay (Bến Thủ Thiêm) or the "Tropical Almond Tree Quay" (Bến Cây Bàng) as there is a big Terminalia catappa tree nearby that still exist. When there was not any bridge or tunnel cross Saigon River to connect with Thủ Thiêm, it helps transit people from the downtown in the west bank of the river to Thủ Thiêm or other area in the river east bank and backwards. The ferry activities stopped at the end of 2011, after the Saigon River Tunnel was inaugurated.

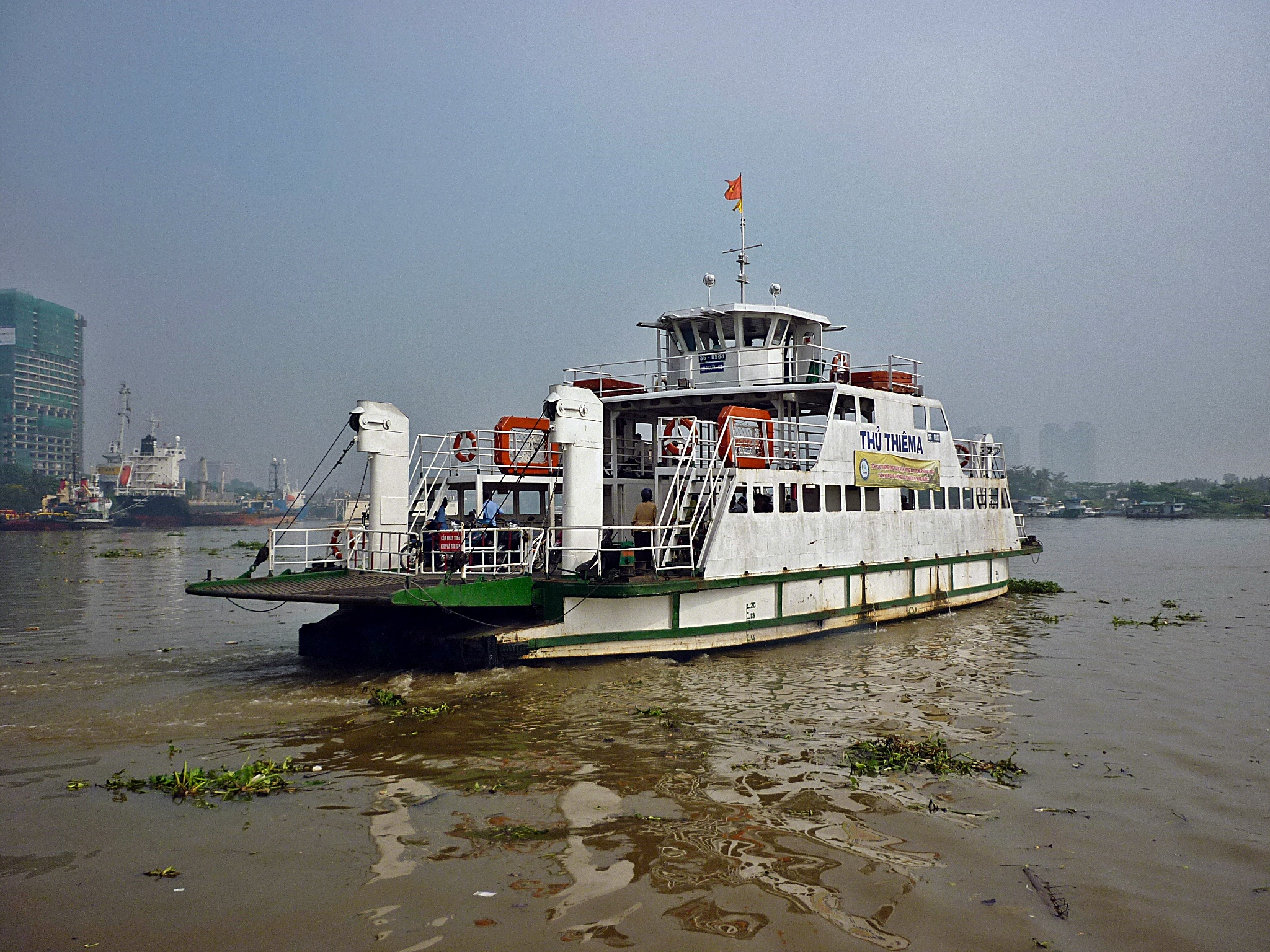
Thủ Thiêm A Ferry

The park was opened on 23 December 2023, after a refurbishment of an area empty and abandoned for more than ten years. Since 31 December 2023, the park is a popular location for New Year Eve's celebrations, with thousands attending and firework shows for major events in the city, not only New Year Eve's, annually happen in the nearby Thủ Thiêm Tunnel Roof.

Few months later, the Thủ Thiêm Quay is also comeback as a pier for the Saigon Waterbus, it is located near the old ferry terminal and also has a short route crossing the Saigon River from Bạch Đằng Pier to Thủ Thiêm Pier just like the older Thủ Thiêm Ferry line.

== Landmark and structures ==
=== An Khánh Temple ===
The An Khánh Temple (Đình thần An Khánh) is a village temple first built in the period of 1679-1725 when An Khánh still a village. It was once demolished during the construction of Thủ Thiêm New Urban Area and restored in 2023, it is now recognized as city-level historic relic.

=== Ông Cậy Bridge ===
Ông Cậy Bridge is a bridge crosses the same name canal, which is a distributary of Saigon River. Once to be a local bridge that accessible to vehicles and pedestrian, it is now rebuilt in 2024 by Khang Gia Land as a scenery pedestrian bridge after demolished for its degration. After restoration, the constructor added a new name as Bridge of Love (Cầu Tình Yêu), the representor of the constructor states that "When the bridge was first completed, many people came and called it the "Bridge of Love". Listening to many people's opinions, we decided to give it a new name, the " Bridge of Love" signifying that the structure has received much love and appreciation from everyone." Yet, the original name is the only name to be keep in the city management list.

=== Thủ Thiêm Parish Church & Congregation of the Holy Cross Lovers ===
Thủ Thiêm Parish Church & Congregation of the Holy Cross Lovers (Nhà thờ Giáo xứ Thủ Thiêm và Hội dòng mến Thánh giá Thủ Thiêm) is a complex of parish church and chapel since 1840. It was threaten to be demolished for the Lotte Eco Smart City project of Lotte Properties (Lotte Group) with partners in Thủ Thiêm New Urban Area. However, it was recognized as city-level historic relic in 2019 and the Thủ Thiêm urban planning kept this site as a relic site and cut half of the Lotte project.
