= Ho Chi Minh City University of Transport =

University in Ho Chi Minh City, Vietnam

University of Transport Ho Chi Minh City
- Trường Đại học Giao thông vận tải Thành phố Hồ Chí Minh
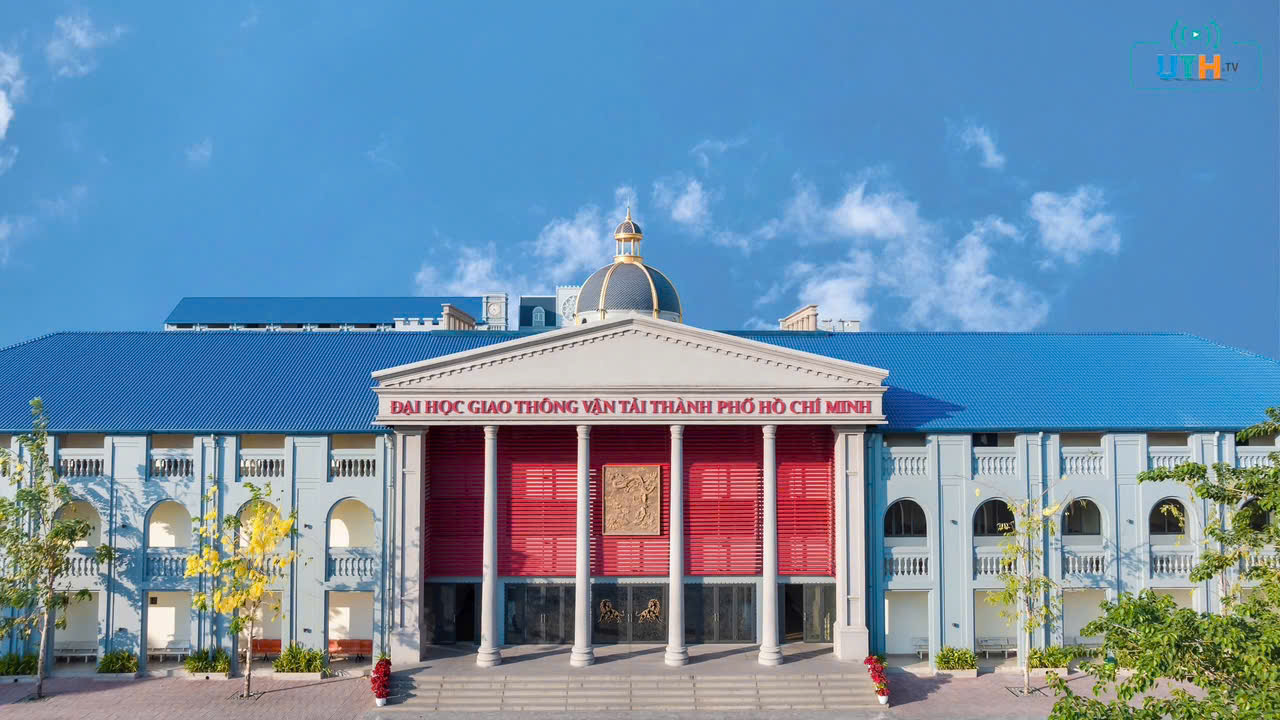
- The main campus of The University
- Other names: UTH – field code (UTH)
- Type: Public
- Established: 2001
- Principal: Nguyen Xuan Phuong
- Location: 02 Võ Oanh, Thạnh Mỹ Tây, Ho Chi Minh City, Vietnam; 10°48′17″N 106°42′59″E
- Website: ut.edu.vn
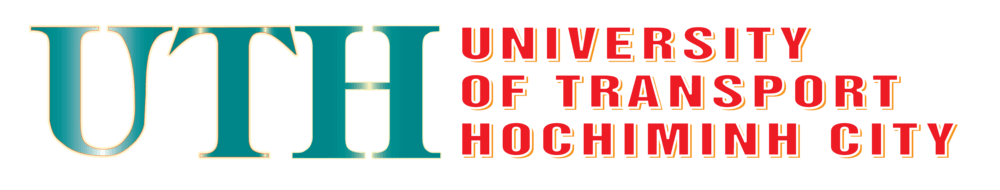

Ho Chi Minh City University of Transport or University of Transport Ho Chi Minh City, abbreviated as UTH or UT-HCMC (Vietnamese: Đại học Giao thông Vận tải Thành phố Hồ Chí Minh) is a public university under the Ministry of Transport (Now is Ministry of Construction) in Vietnam. The university provides associate, undergraduate and postgraduate education in various areas of transport. The main campus is in Binh Thanh District, Ho Chi Minh City. The predecessor of the university was the Ho Chi Minh City branch of Vietnam Maritime University (VMU), founded in 1988. From this branch, it was split from VMU upgraded to university status in 2001.

== Education quality ==
The school was accredited by the National University system and certified to meet educational quality standards on 27 March 2017. In 2023, it ranked 40th on the Vietnamese University Ranking.

== Programs ==
- Postgraduate
- Undergraduate
- Short courses

== Faculties ==
- Marine Navigation
- Ship Machine
- Electronic and Electrical Engineering and Telecommunication
- Ship Engineering
- Transportation Engineering
- Construction Engineering
- Mechanical Engineering
- Information technology
- Maritime Business Administration
- Basic Sciences
- Naval Architect and offshore construction

== Campuses ==
- Campus 1: No.2, Street D3, Ward 25, Bình Thạnh District, Ho Chi Minh City (now is Võ Oanh Street, Thạnh Mỹ Tây)
- Campus 2: 17, Trần Não Street, Bình An Ward, District 2, Ho Chi Minh City (now is An Khánh), including lecture hall and dorm
- Campus 3: 70, Tô Ký Street, Tân Chánh Hiệp, District 12, Ho Chi Minh City (now is Trung Mỹ Tây)
- Campus 4: 17A, February 3rd Boulevard, Ward 11, Vũng Tàu (now is Phước Thắng)
