= District 2, Ho Chi Minh City =

Old urban district in Ho Chi Minh City, Vietnam

District 2 Quận 2
- Urban district
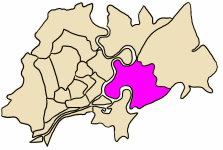
- Position in HCMC's core

- Location in Vietnam
- Coordinates: 10°46′51″N 106°45′25″E
- Country: Vietnam
- Centrally governed city: Ho Chi Minh City
- Seat: 249 Lương Định Của
- Wards: 11 wards

Area
  - Total: 50 km^{2} (19 sq mi)

Population (2018)
  - Total: 168,680
  - Density: 3,400/km^{2} (8,700/sq mi)

Demographics
  - Main ethnic groups: Kinh
- Time zone: UTC+07 (ICT)
- Website: www.quan2.hochiminhcity.gov.vn

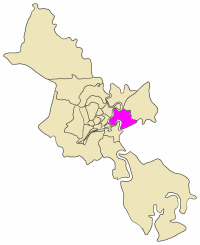
Map showing the location of District 2 within metropolitan Ho Chi Minh City

District 2 is a former urban district of Ho Chi Minh City, Vietnam. As of 2010, the district had a population of 140,621 and a total area of 50 km^{2}.

District 2 was merged with District 9 and Thủ Đức district to become Thu Duc City on December 9, 2020, by Standing Committee of the National Assembly's approval.

== Administration ==
The district has 11 wards (phường):

1. An Lợi Đông
2. An Khánh
3. An Phú
4. Bình An
5. Bình Khánh
6. Bình Trưng Đông
7. Bình Trưng Tây
8. Cát Lái
9. Thạnh Mỹ Lợi
10. Thảo Điền
11. Thủ Thiêm

== Development ==
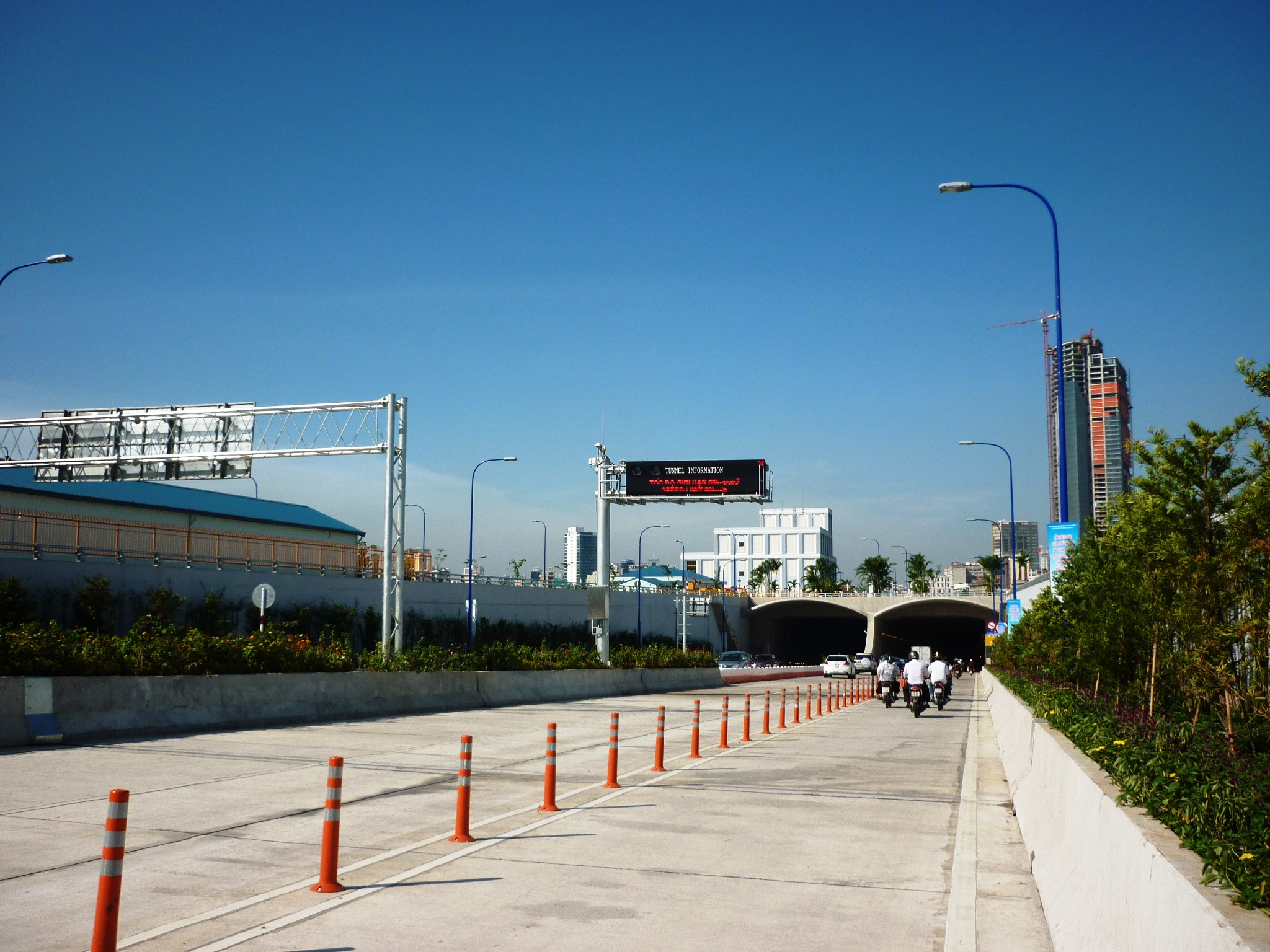
Thủ Thiêm Tunnel

In the past, District 2 was one of the poorest parts of Ho Chi Minh City due to the separation by the Saigon River from the city center. However, it is now one of the prioritized areas for investment by the government of Ho Chi Minh City. The completion of Thủ Thiêm Bridge in 2008 and Thủ Thiêm Tunnel in 2011 were expected to support the development of the Thủ Thiêm new urban area. Thủ Thiêm Tunnel joins District 2 with District 1 (Central Sài Gòn), the central area of Ho Chi Minh City. The other connection of District 2 to the central city area is the Thủ Thiêm Bridge, which connects District 2 and Bình Thạnh district. The transportation to District 2 will be much easier when the metro, whose route passes through District 2, comes into use. This will be the first metro in Vietnam, as part of a larger goal to modernize the city to the rest of the world.

The Vietnamese government is seeking to build a completely new district for wealthy citizens as well as a new economic center, with the aims to be as modern as Singapore and Hong Kong.

Less prosperous agricultural workers of District 2 have been forced to move in slum clearance measures. Thatched houses is planned to be replaced by multi-story houses and villas. A few single-family homes will be constructed for those with large incomes. A large number of citizens is planned to go on living in high-grade apartment blocks. Each block aims to contains swimming pools, tennis courts, shopping malls, and other necessary services. There is plan for be kindergartens, elementary schools, and high schools in the zone. While universities is planned by the city government to be moved to Thủ Đức district to form a University Village. Beside the residential area will be the economic and trade zone with skyscrapers.

District 2, particularly Thảo Điền ward, has a large portion of Ho Chi Minh City's expatriate community, and as such has a large number of restaurants, bars and shops selling European foods, particularly the high street Xuân Thủy. This area is also home to many large apartment developments. Traffic has become a major problem in District 2 due to its proximity to several international schools and many residents who travel by private vehicle.

== Education ==
District 2 is home to many international schools, both due to its high number of foreign residents and its proximity to District 1. Below is a list of schools that are in this area:

- International School Ho Chi Minh City, 28 Võ Trường Toản Street
- British International School Vietnam has the An Phú Primary and An Phú Secondary campuses
- Australian International School, Vietnam, 264 Mai Chí Thọ Road
- EUROPEAN International School Ho Chi Minh City, 730 F-G-K, Lê Văn Miến Street, Thảo Điền ward
- Deutsche Schule HCMC – The International German School (IGS), 12 Võ Trường Toản Street, Thảo Điền ward
- EtonHouse International Pre-School Franchise - An Phu, Somerset Vista, 628c Hanoi Highway, An Phú ward
- The American School, 6 Song Hanh Road, An Phú ward
