= Vietnam International Financial Center =

The Vietnam International Financial Center (VIFC; Vietnamese: Trung tâm tài chính quốc tế tại Việt Nam) is a dual city financial hub located in Ho Chi Minh City and Da Nang, Vietnam, established in 2025. The Center spans 1,200 hectares (3,000 acres).

== History ==
The project was officially announced on 21 December 2025 by Prime Minister Phạm Minh Chính.

== Branches ==
VIFC is established as a single legal entity, operating in Ho Chi Minh City and Da Nang under unified operating mechanisms, standards, and regulations.

=== Ho Chi Minh City ===
The Vietnam International Financial Center in Ho Chi Minh City (VIFC-HCMC) is temporarily headquartered at 8 Nguyễn Huệ Boulevard. It was place of Imexco Building (Import-Export Company) but was fired in 1989, then rebuilt and initially known as OSIC Building and later VTP Office Center, the headquarters will be relocated to Thủ Thiêm after the VIFC 99-storey Tower completed. It will be led by Trương Minh Huy Vũ, head of the Ho Chi Minh City Institute for Development Studies. On 26 November 2025, Binance and the Ho Chi Minh City Department of Finance signed an MOU to support the development of the city's IFC.

The area of VIFC-HCMC spans in wards of Bến Thành (where the Ho Chi Minh City Stock Exchange is located), Saigon (also known as Bến Nghé; the historic financial district of the city where the HCMC branch of the State Bank of Vietnam and the National Treasury are also located) and Thủ Thiêm Quarter (of An Khánh ward; the new financial district of the city). The inauguration of the 55-storey tower Saigon Marina IFC in Ba Son in August 2025, on the 80th anniversary of the August Revolution, marked the start of VIFC-HCMC.

The Specialized court at VIFC-HCMC is located at 34 Nguyễn Văn Trỗi Boulevard, Cầu Kiệu, which was formerly used as the People's Court of Phú Nhuận district.

=== Da Nang ===
The Vietnam International Finance Center Da Nang (VIFC-DN) will be led by Hồ Kỳ Minh, 54, vice chairman of the Da Nang People's Committee.
