= Thủ Thiêm New Urban Area =

Urban redevelopment project in Thủ Đức City, Ho Chi Minh City

Coordinates: 10.773285°N 106.722912°E

Thủ Thiêm New Urban Area Khu đô thị mới Thủ Thiêm, Bán đảo Thủ Thiêm Thủ Thiêm Peninsula, Thủ Thiêm Urban Area
- New town and Central business district
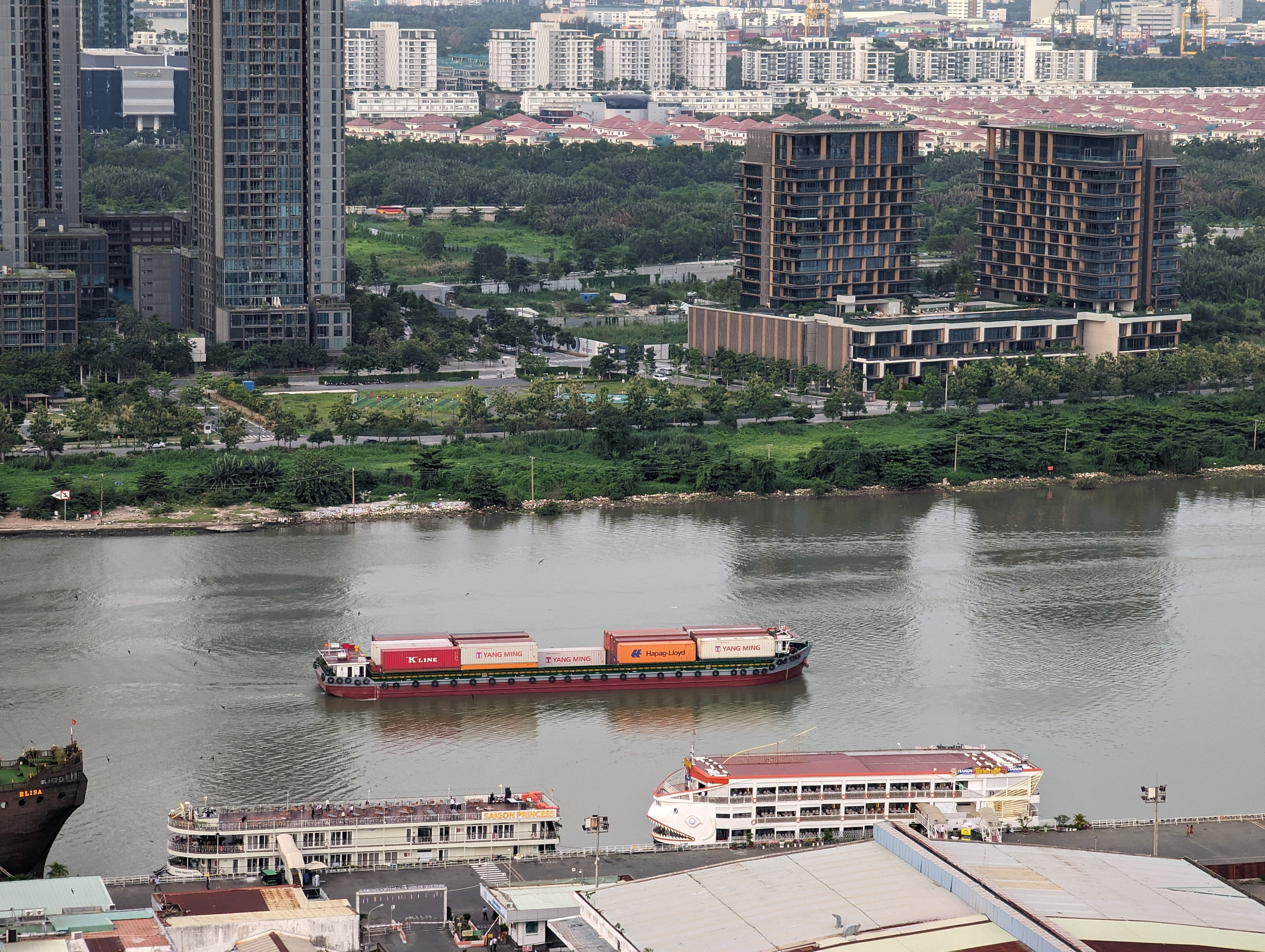
- Empire City Complex with Sala urban area behind, part of Thủ Thiêm urban area in 2023

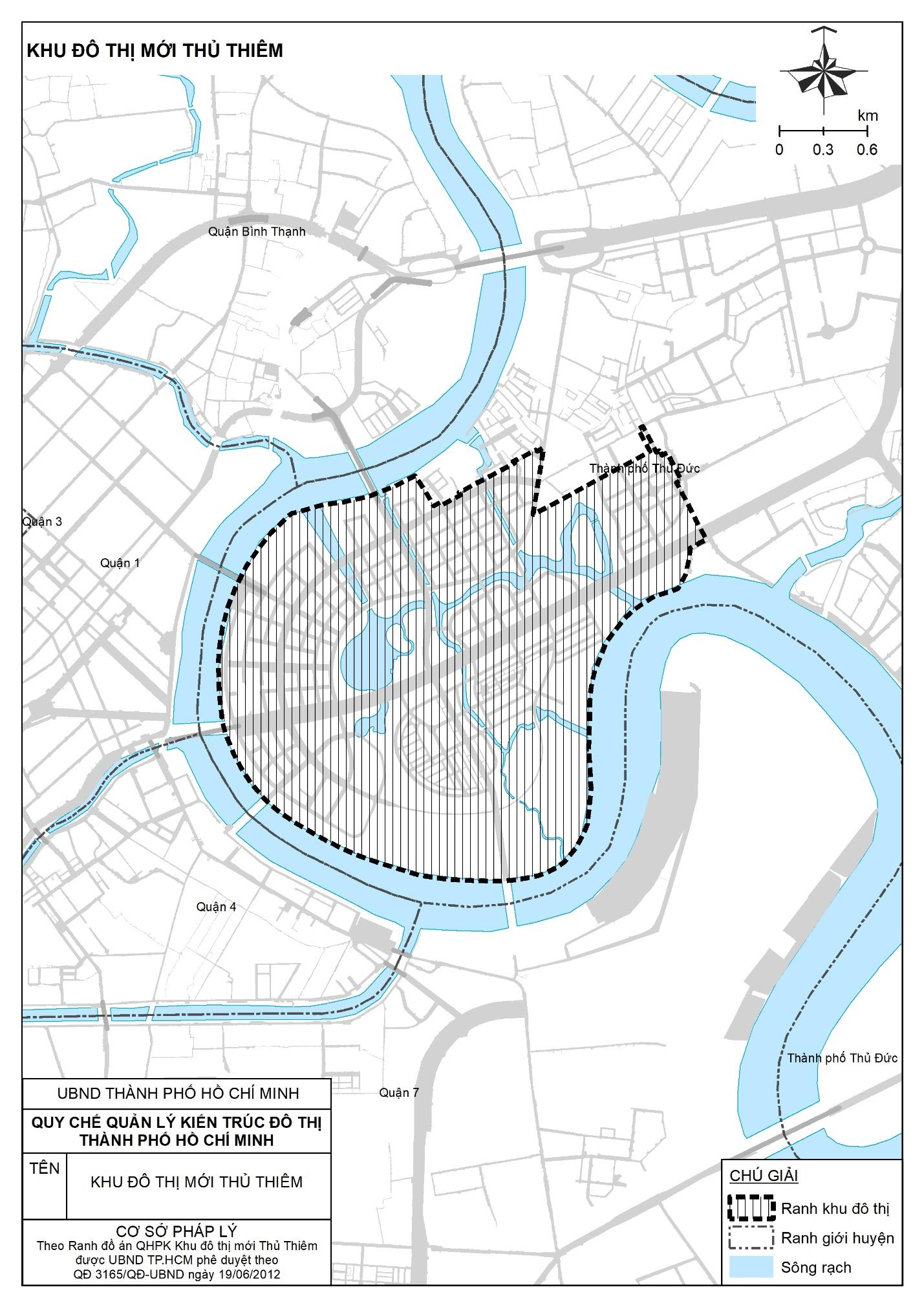
- 2022 governmental projection of Thủ Thiêm new urban area. The subdivisions portrayed on the map may have become obsolete following the 2025 Vietnamese administrative reform, but the designated area remains relevant.
- Interactive map of Thủ Thiêm New Urban Area
- Country: Vietnam
- Municipality: Ho Chi Minh City
- Ward: An Khánh, Ho Chi Minh City

Area
  - Total: 6.57 km^{2} (2.54 sq mi)

Thủ Thiêm New Urban Area (Vietnamese: Khu đô thị mới Thủ Thiêm) is an 6.57 km^{2} (1,620-acre) ongoing urban redevelopment project and a planned community locates in the former District 2 and subsequently Thủ Đức City, now An Khánh ward of Ho Chi Minh City. It is currently under development. As of 2026, the area has been chosen to be the new seat of government for the expanded Ho Chi Minh City.

== Location ==
Location of Thủ Thiêm new urban area on Ho Chi Minh City map

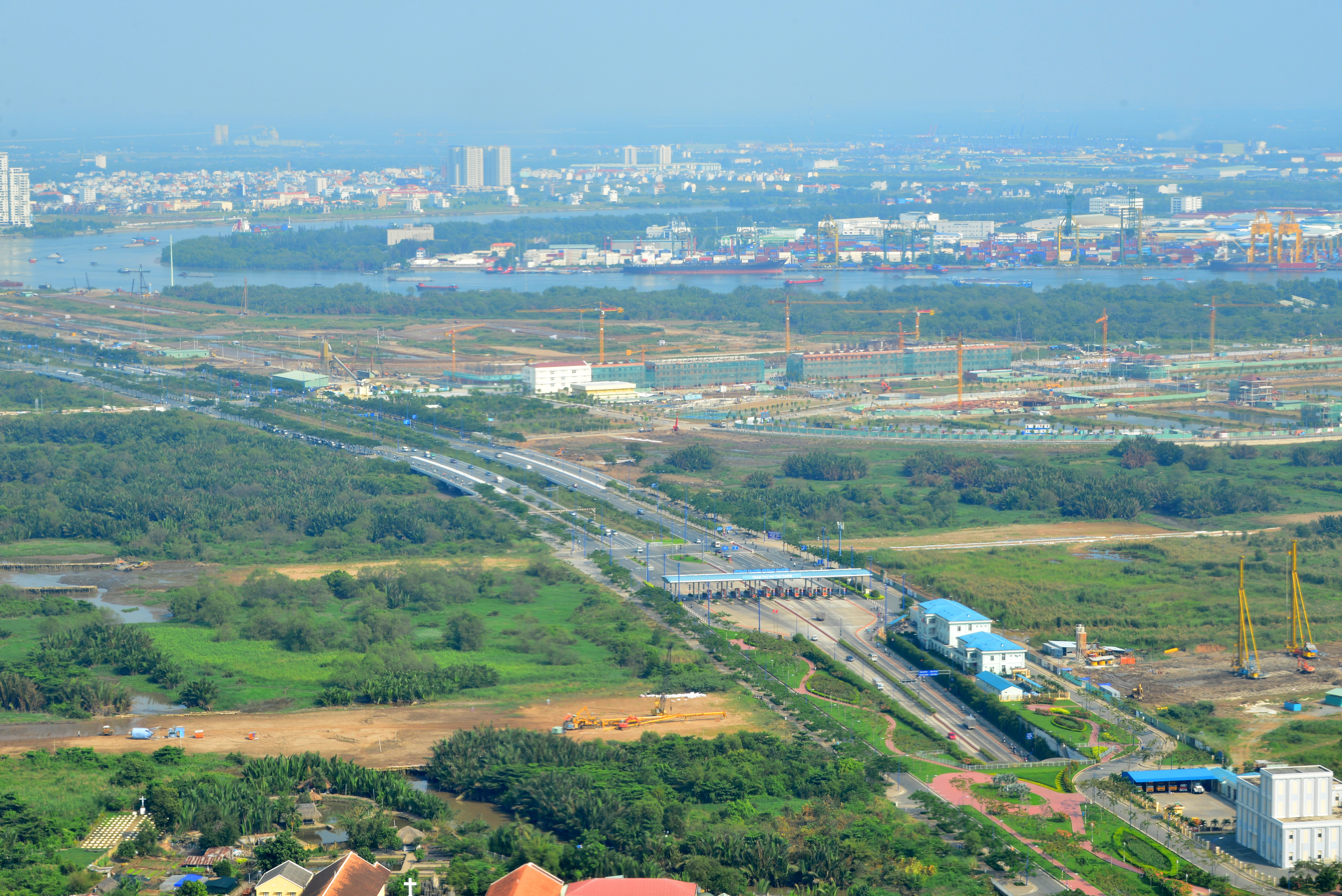
A corner of Thủ Thiêm new urban area seen from above (photo taken in 2015)

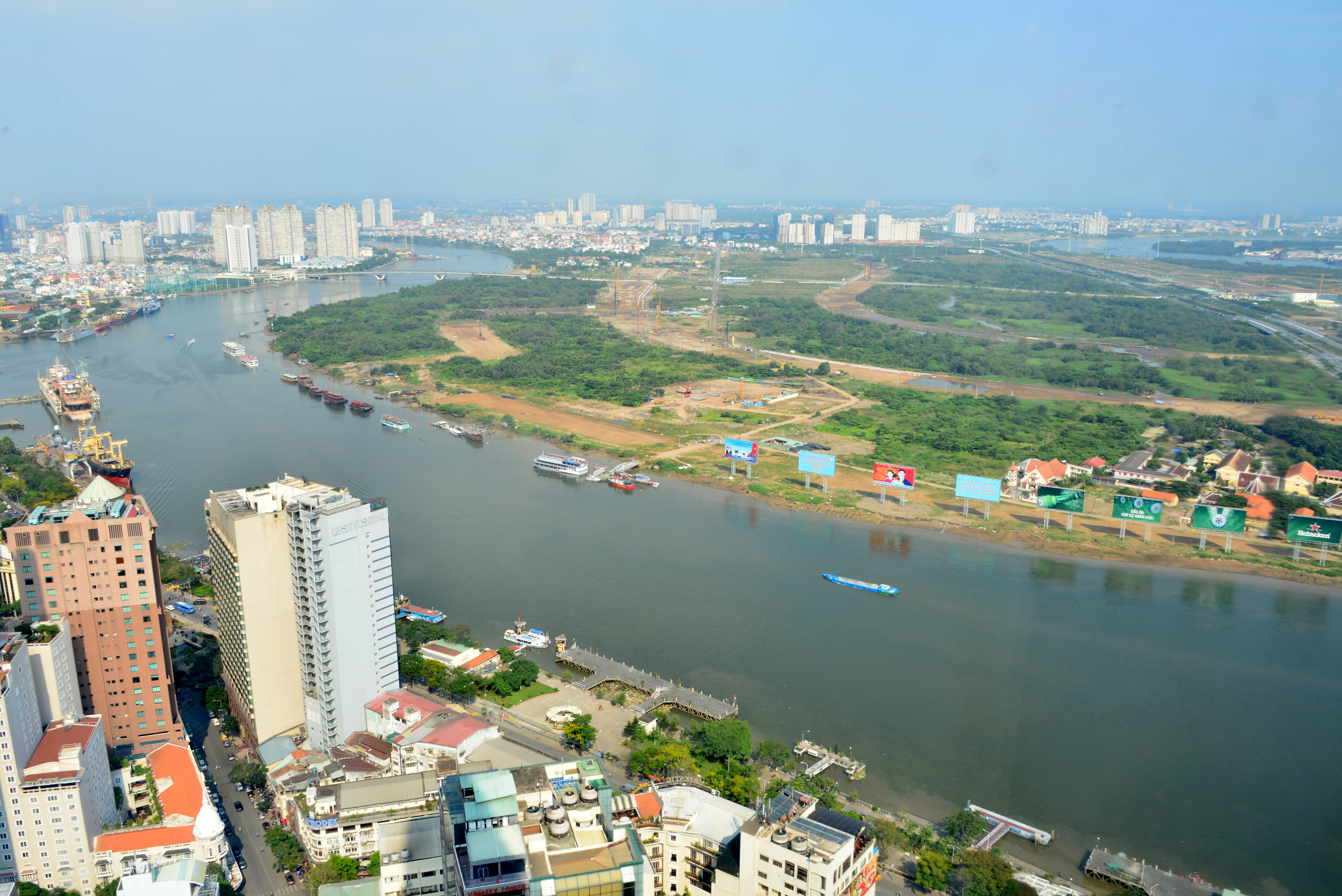
Thủ Thiêm new urban area seen from above Bitexco Financial Tower (photo taken in 2015)

Thủ Thiêm is situated on a point bar of the Saigon River, which also references as Thủ Thiêm Peninsula, in the municipal division known as Thủ Đức. On the opposite bank of the river are the area of former Bình Thạnh District, District 1—Ho Chi Minh City's historic central business district—District 4 and District 7 (respectively from upstream to downstream). It includes some wards of Thủ Đức then: Thủ Thiêm, An Lợi Đông and a part of An Khánh. Now all An Khánh, Ho Chi Minh City after the 2025 rearrangement.

== History ==
Before its clearance for redevelopment, Thủ Thiêm was one of the most densely settled areas of Ho Chi Minh City and included a central market established in 1751, around the Saigon riverside area. Beginning in 2002 and continuing for almost a decade, between 14,000 and 15,000 households were removed from the development site and resettled.

Master planning for the site began in 1998, anticipating the completion of several bridges and tunnels that would connect District 2 to Ho Chi Minh City's central business district across the river. In 2003, Sasaki Associates won an international design competition to plan the site.

The project is being carried out in stages, and is scheduled to be completed in 15 years, depending on the investment capital. Priority is given to the infrastructure investors with favorable assistance for the city government as well as preferential taxation.

Many local residents protested against relocations.

== Urban layout ==
The urban area covers an area of 7 square kilometres and consists of several sections: residences, pools, parks and office sections. Almost all buildings here are to be of 10 to 40-story. Once completed, this new urban area will be the city's new center along with the historic center District 1. This new urban area is connected with the existing downtown with 5 bridges tally, including finished Thủ Thiêm Bridge (connect to Bình Thạnh district), Ba Son Bridge (connect to District 1; both are completed), Saigon River Pedestrian Bridge (connect to Mê Linh Square, District 1; under construction), Thu Thiem 3 Bridge (connect to District 4), Thu Thiem 4 Bridge (connect to District 7; both are planned) and a completed 6-lane underwater tunnel.

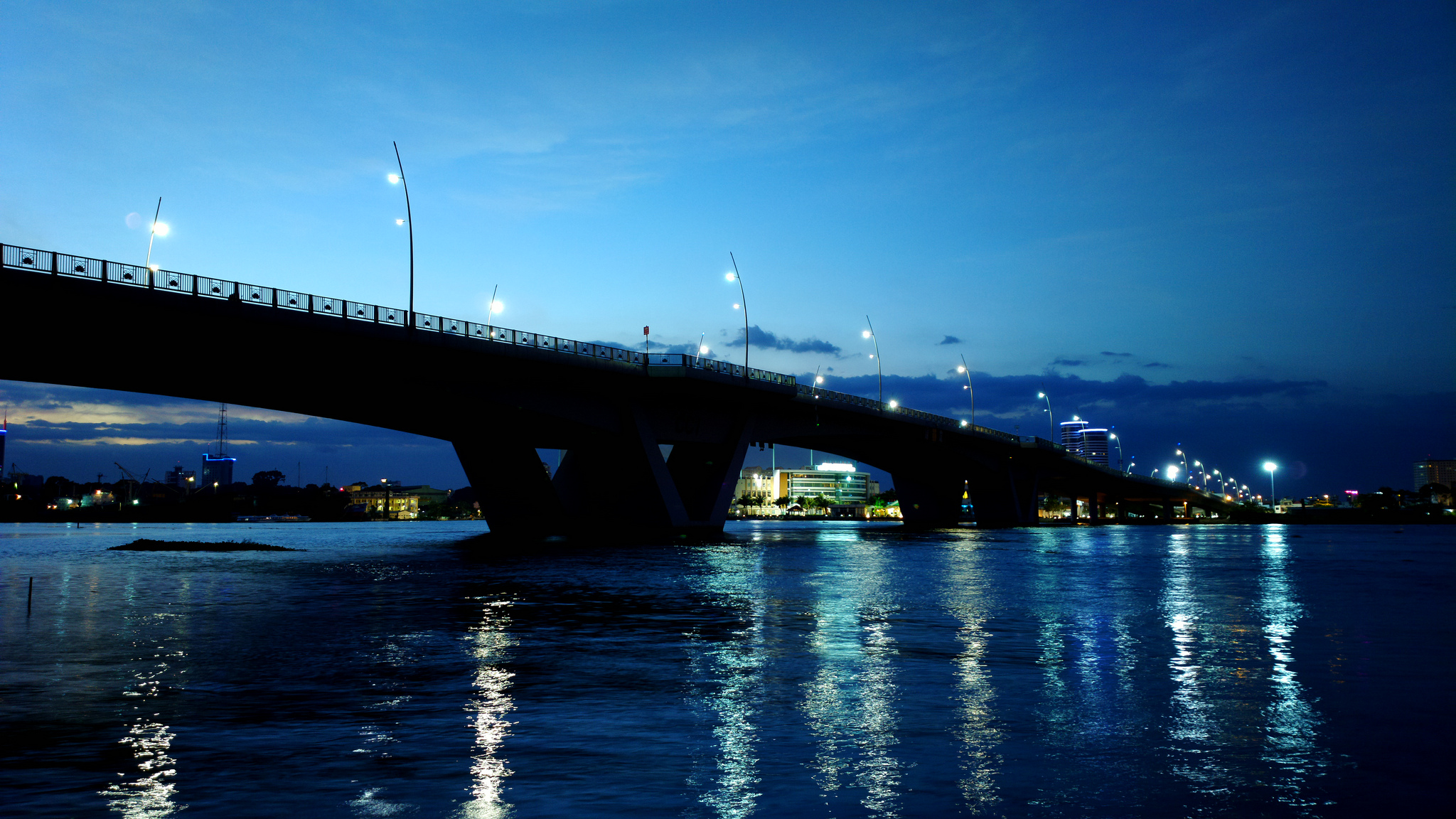
Thủ Thiêm Bridge, the first bridge connects Saigon river west bank to Thủ Thiêm, completed in 2008

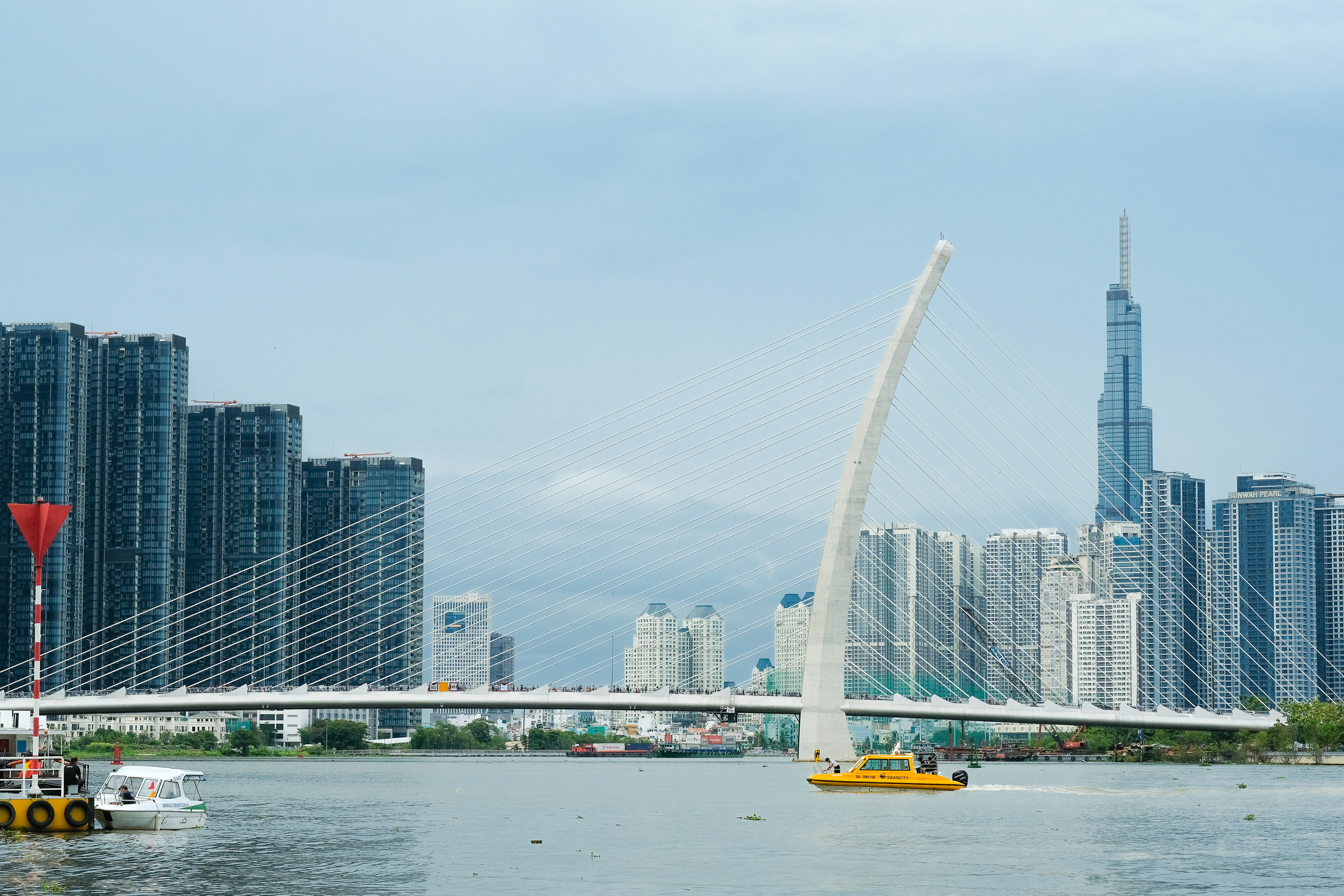
The recently opened Ba Son Bridge connects Thủ Thiêm new urban area with District 1's downtown

The main axis roads in Thủ Thiêm are:

- Route T13: Initially known as Thủ Thiêm East–West Axis Road (Đường trục Đông – Tây Thủ Thiêm), now Mai Chí Thọ Boulevard (or Highway), part of East–West Highway, connect with Ho Chi Minh City–Long Thanh–Dau Giay Expressway to access Long Thanh International Airport in the east or connect with the old downtown, Võ Văn Kiệt Boulevard to the west and more further is Ho Chi Minh City–Trung Luong Expressway to access Mekong Delta.
- Route R14: Initially known as Thủ Thiêm North–South Axis Road (Đường trục Bắc – Nam Thủ Thiêm), now Nguyễn Cơ Thạch Boulevard. Connect Thạnh Mỹ Tây with Tân Thuận from north to south with Thủ Thiêm 1 and 4 Bridges
- Route R1: Initially known as Đại lộ Vòng cung (The Arc Avenue or Crescent Boulevard), now Trần Bạch Đằng Boulevard. It is an arterial route with an arched alignment that passes by landmark structures and has been selected as the venue for future parades, this road is equivalent to Lê Duẩn Boulevard in the old downtown
- Route R2: Initially known as Central Lakeside Road (Đường Ven hồ Trung Tâm), now Tố Hữu Road. This route is an arc-shaped road running parallel to Route R1, starting from the roundabout on Trần Não Street (another arterial road that begins at Saigon Bridge), it goes through the central lake and the new Ho Chi Minh City's Administrative and Political Center Building. The Route R12 is a short street connect the road with Ba Son Bridge to go to Tôn Đức Thắng Boulevard
- Route R3: Initially known as Saigon Riverside Road, now Nguyễn Thiện Thành Street. It runs along the Saigon River with the riverside park, starting at intersection C3 (intersecting with Route R1 in the north) and ending at intersection C4 (intersecting with Route R1 adn R4 in the south).
- Route R4: Initially known as the Elevated Delta road, now Bùi Thiện Ngộ Street. It connects the Nguyễn Thiện Thành Street (Route R3, riverside road) to the Trần Bạch Đằng Boulevard (Route R1) at the C4 intersection, traverses the peninsula southern delta area via an elevated viaduct, and terminates at Mai Chí Thọ Highway.
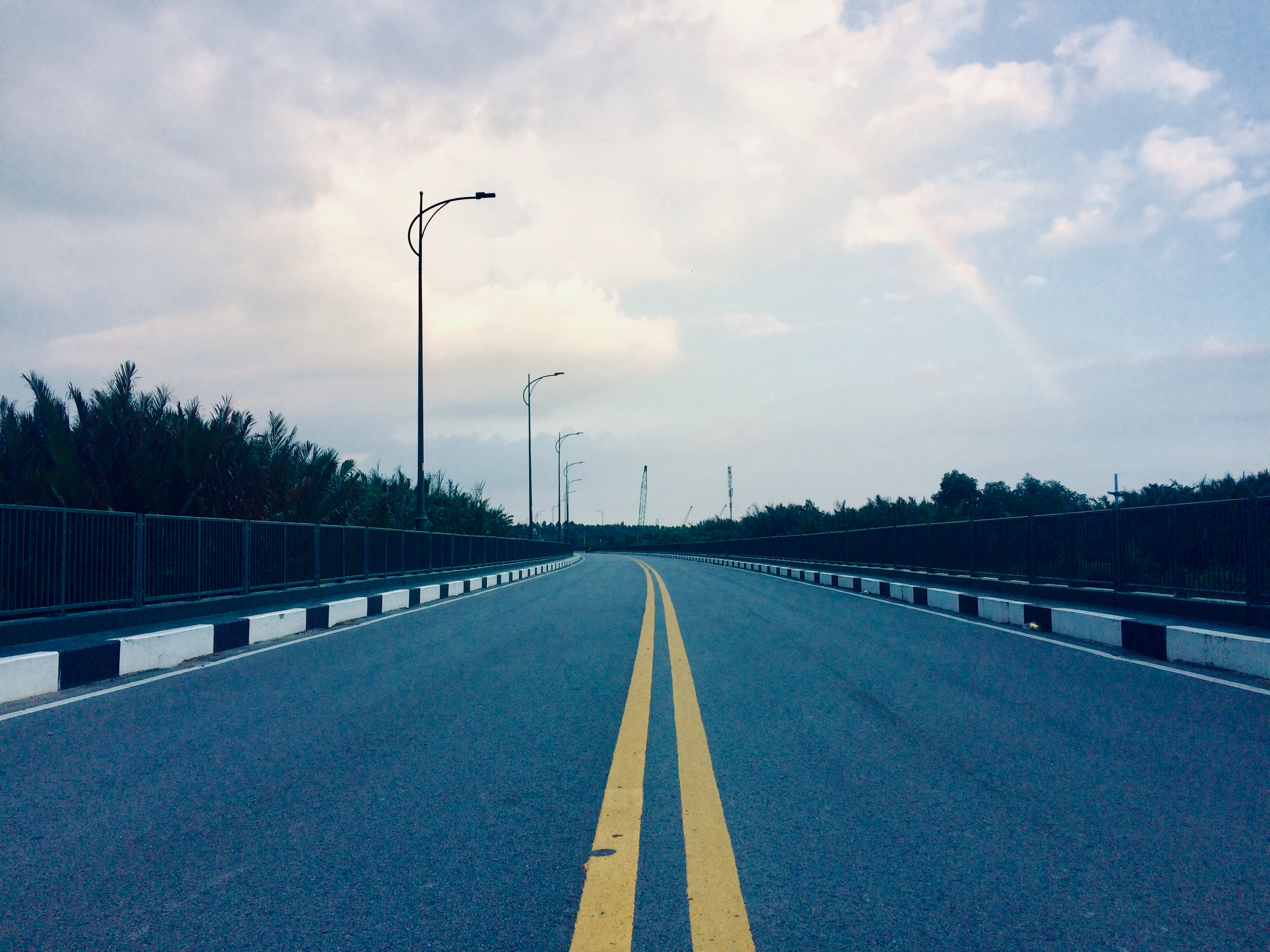
Bùi Thiện Ngộ Street in Thủ Thiêm new urban area

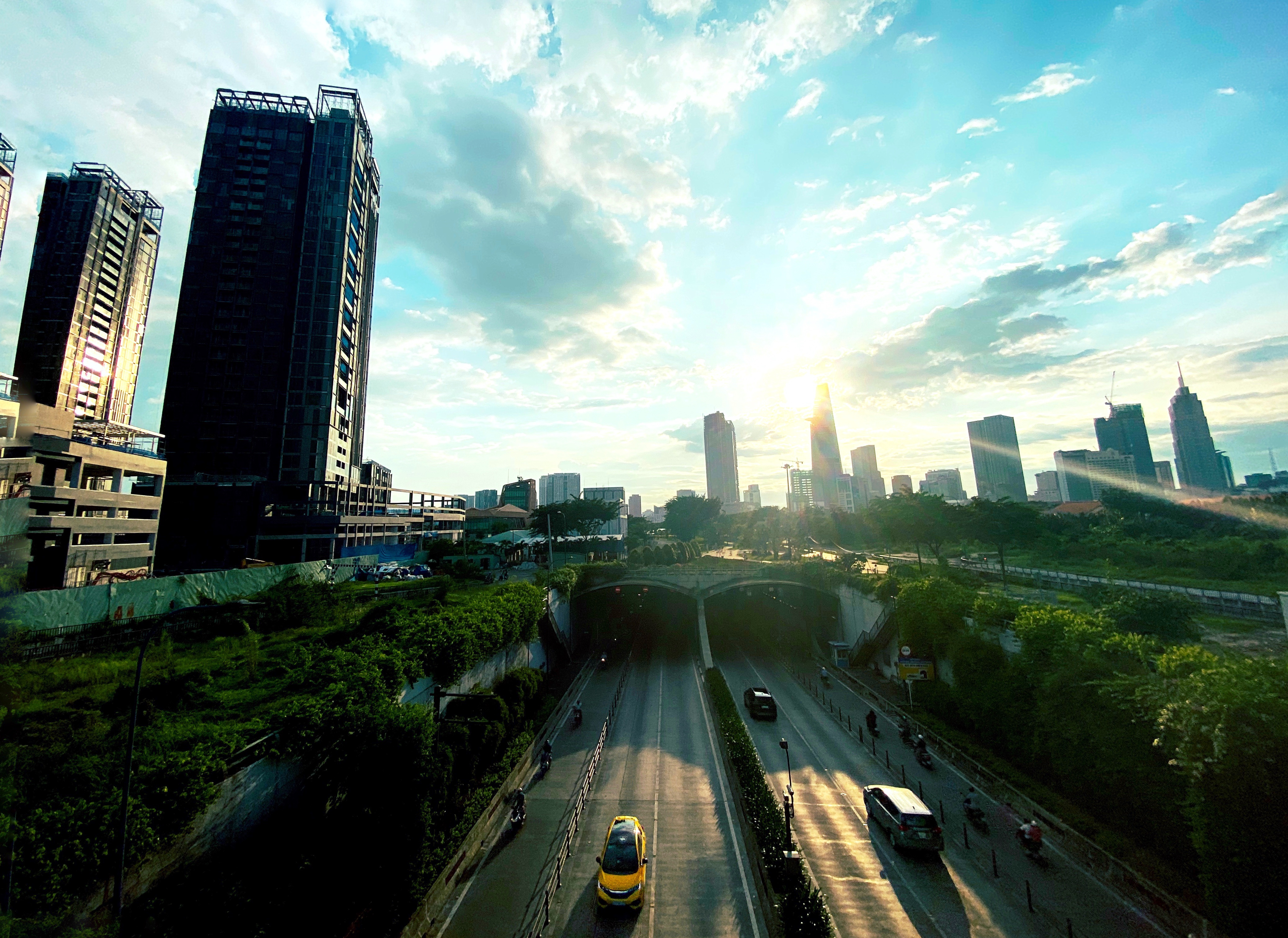
Saigon River Tunnel, view from Thủ Thiêm to District 1

=== Railway ===
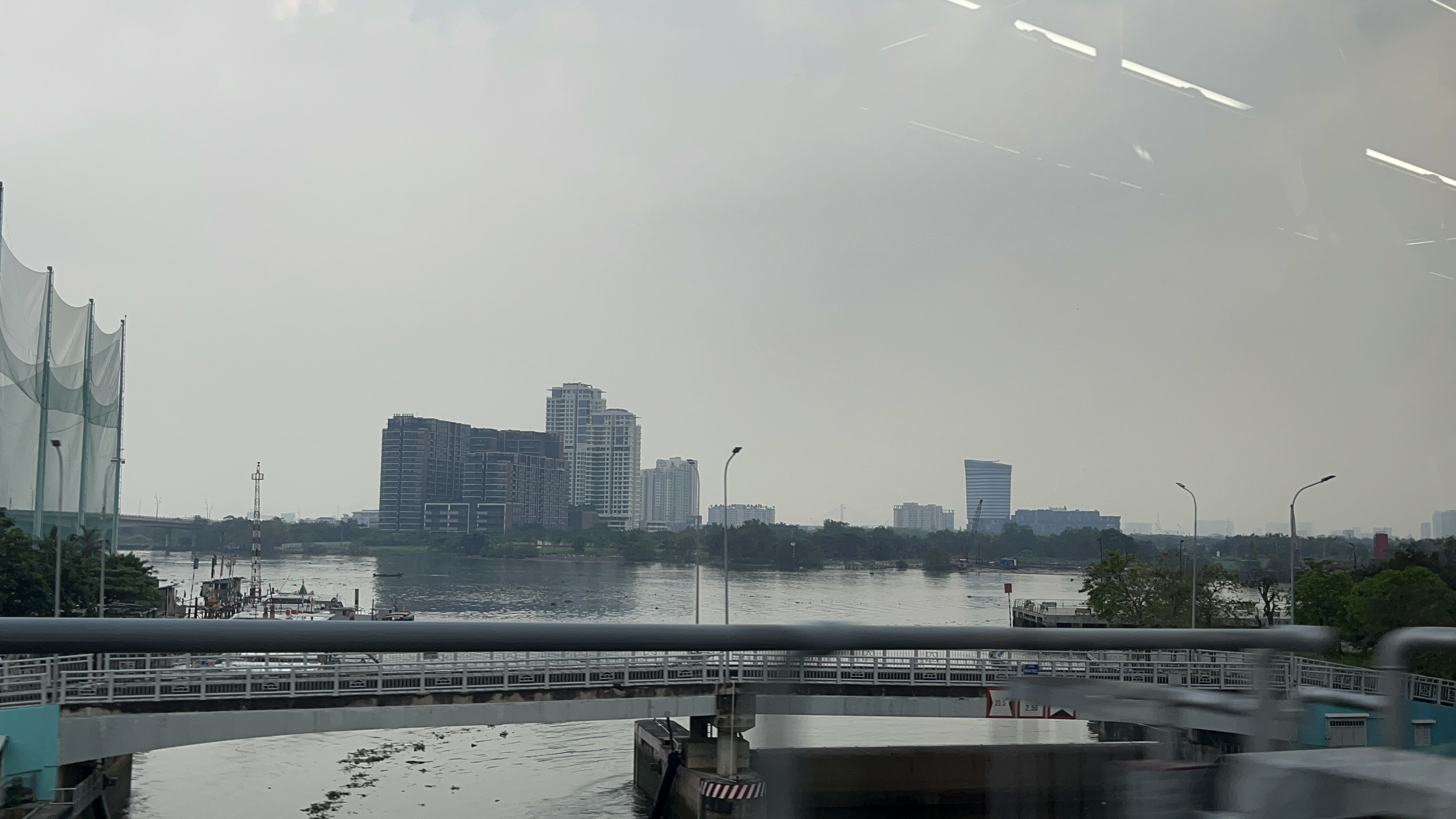
Thủ Thiêm Peninsula in 2025 seen from a train on HCMC Metro Line 1, stretch from Ba Son station to Van Thanh Park station

Based on the urban railway planning of Ho Chi Minh City 2025, Thủ Thiêm will have three MRT Lines, including:

- Ho Chi Minh City Metro Line 7 (planned), run along under Trần Bạch Đằng Blvd (Crescent Blvd – Route R1), connecting with Tân Kiên Medical Campus (Bình Chánh), Phú Mỹ Hưng urban area, Thanh Đa – Bình Quới, Trường Thọ New Town and Saigon Hi-Tech Park
- Ho Chi Minh City Metro Line 2 (under construction), run along under Mai Chí Thọ Blvd (East–West Highway, Route T13) connecting with Bến Thành and Củ Chi (Northwest urban area)
- Thủ Thiêm Station is an interchange of Line 2 with Thủ Thiêm–Long Thành Light Rail and North–South express railway, connecting Thủ Thiêm with Long Thanh International Airport, both railways run along with the Ho Chi Minh City–Long Thanh–Dau Giay Expressway
