= Saigon River Tunnel =

Coordinates: 10°46′N 106°42′E

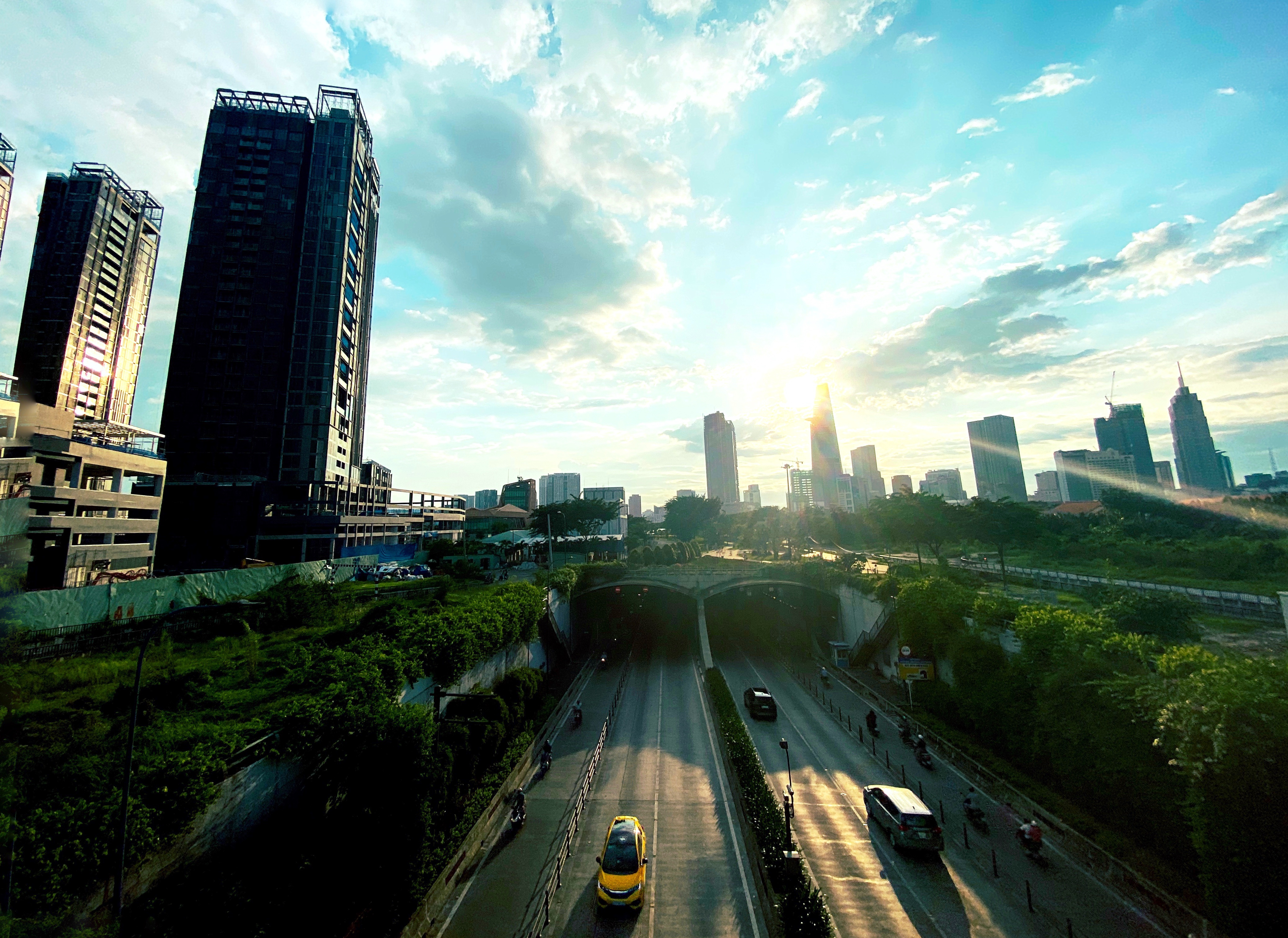
- Saigon River Tunnel in 2020, from Thủ Thiêm to Saigon
- Interactive map of Saigon River Tunnel

Overview
- Other name: Thủ Thiêm Tunnel
- Location: Thủ Thiêm–Saigon, Ho Chi Minh City
- Status: Completed
- System: Immersed Tunnel System
- Waterway: Saigon River
- Route: East–West Highway (Ho Chi Minh City)
- Start: Mai Chí Thọ Boulevard, Saigon River Park, Thủ Thiêm
- End: Võ Văn Kiệt Boulevard, Financial District, Saigon

Operation
- Constructed: 2005
- Opened: November 20, 2011; 14 years ago
- Owner: PC Ho Chi Minh City
- Toll: No

Technical
- Design engineer: Oriental Consultants in association with TEDI & APECO, Obayashi Corporation (Main contractor)
- Length: 1,490 metres (4,890 ft)
- No. of lanes: 6 lanes (3 lanes per direction)
- Operating speed: 60 kilometres per hour (37 mph) (for automobiles); 40 kilometres per hour (25 mph) (for motorbikes)
- Tunnel clearance: 9 metres (30 ft)
- Width: 33.3 metres (109 ft)

The Saigon River Tunnel, better known colloquially as the Thủ Thiêm Tunnel, is an underwater tunnel that opened on November 20, 2011. It runs underneath the Saigon River in Ho Chi Minh City, the largest city of Vietnam. The tunnel was built with capital from JICA's ODA, in conjunction with a consortium of Japanese contractors. The tunnel connects the existing urban center of Ho Chi Minh City with Thu Thiem New Urban Area in Thủ Đức. The Saigon River Tunnel is part of the East–West Highway, an important road project to ease the congestion of transport in the inner city as well as transportation from downtown to the Mekong Delta region. The existing downtown was previously only linked with the Thu Thiem New Urban Area by many bridges, namely: Thủ Thiêm Bridge, Phú Mỹ Bridge and Ba Son Bridge.

== External links and references ==
- DECISION No. 622/QD-TTg OF JULY 5, 2000 RATIFYING THE INVESTMENT IN THE PROJECT FOR BUILDING THE EAST-WEST AVENUE IN HO CHI MINH CITY by Vietnamese Prime Minister
