= European International School Ho Chi Minh City =

- Trường Quốc tế Châu Âu Thành phố Hồ Chí Minh

Location
- 730F–G–K Lê Văn Miến, (Thảo Điền, Thủ Đức); An Khánh, Ho Chi Minh City; Vietnam; 10.805563°N 106.734779°E

Information
- Type: Private international school
- Motto: "Educational Village, Global Citizens"
- Established: 2009
- Head of school: Ben Armstrong
- Grades: K–12
- Enrollment: 735
- Color: Orange/White/Gold
- Accreditation: International Baccalaureate Organisation (authorised), Council of International Schools (accredited)
- Affiliations: Inspired
- Website: https://www.eishcmc.com/
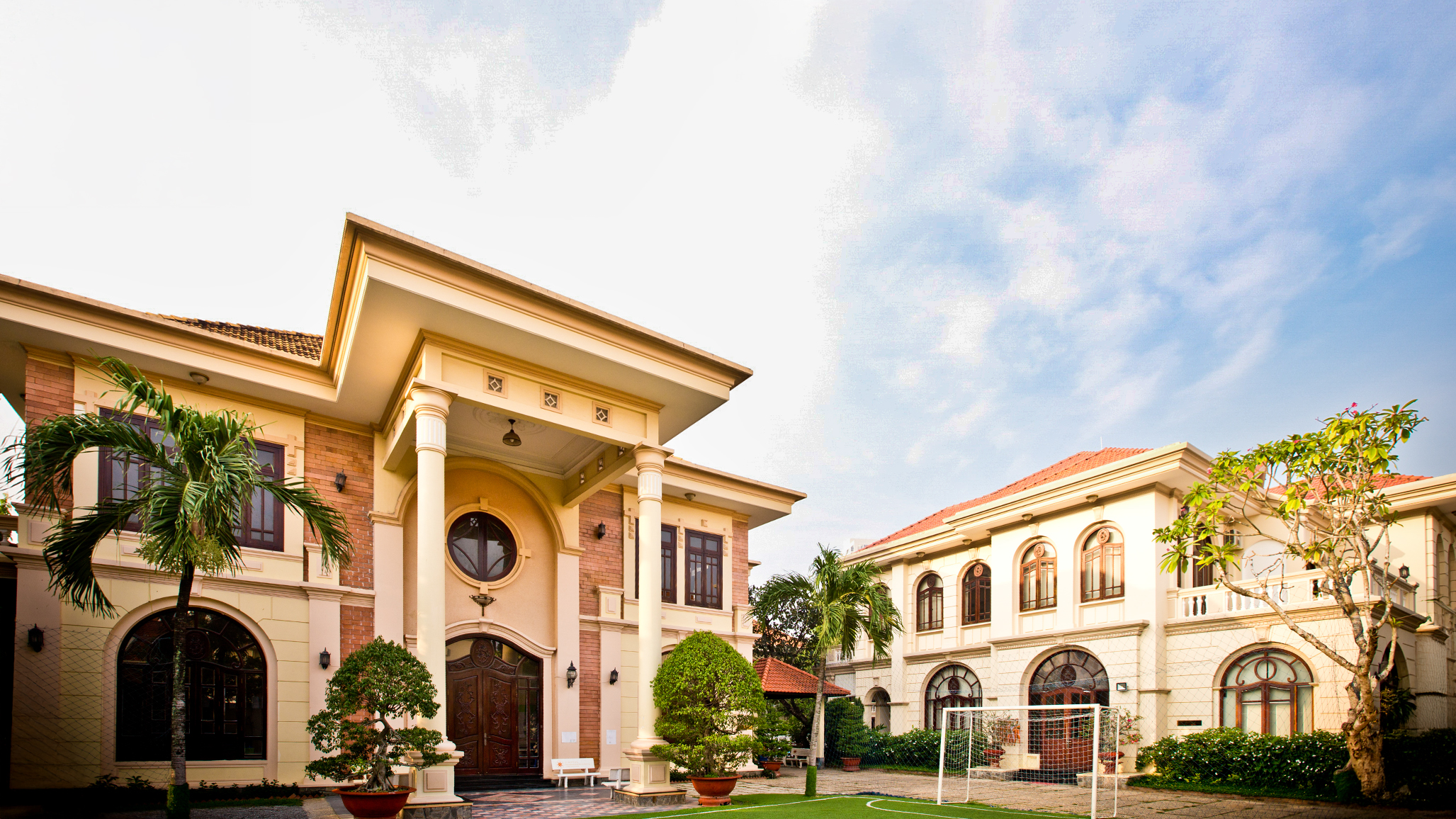
- Main building of EIS's campus

The European International School Ho Chi Minh City (EIS; Vietnamese: Trường Quốc tế Châu Âu Thành phố Hồ Chí Minh) is an international day school for children from 2 to 18 years of age in Ho Chi Minh City, Vietnam. The school is fully accredited by the Council of International Schools (CIS; Hội đồng Trường Quốc tế). EIS's student body is diverse, with students coming from more than 40 countries. It is an International Baccalaureate (IB) World School.

The school is currently owned and operated by Inspired Education Group, an international provider of for-profit schools.

== Campus ==
EIS is located in the heart of Thảo Điền, Thủ Đức, now is An Khánh, Ho Chi Minh City. Its tropical garden campus occupies 13 low-rise villas with separate buildings for different functions.

== Education ==
EIS follows the International Baccalaureate (IB) curriculum and is an officially authorised IB World School with the Primary Years Programme (PYP), Middle Years Programme (MYP) and Diploma Programme (DP). EIS is one of only a few schools in Vietnam to offer the whole IB continuum from Toddler (2 years of age) to Grade 12.

=== Language of instruction ===
English is the language of instruction throughout the school. However, a wide range of global language exposure is offered, such as German, French, Spanish, Korean and Vietnamese.

== After-school activities ==
EIS offers after-school activities for all students from Early Years to Grade 12, to develop their artistic talents, social competencies, physical endurance and skills, as well as have fun in a supervised and supportive environment.
