= Saigon International University =

International private university in Ho Chi Minh City, Vietnam

Coordinates: 10.8451°N 106.7725°E

Motto	Vietnam's spirit, global education.
Established	2007
Type	Private
Full-time academic staff	200 (2025)
Administrative	45
Students	1,510
Location	Ho Chi Minh City, Vietnam
Website	siu.edu.vn

Saigon International University (SIU) is Vietnam's first international private university located in Ho Chi Minh City. SIU is a member of the Group of Asian International Education, an educational and scientific research group in Vietnam.

It is an international university in Vietnam offering undergraduate and graduate programs for both Vietnamese and international students. The university provides instruction in both English and Vietnamese, following the academic standards of American university programs.

== History ==
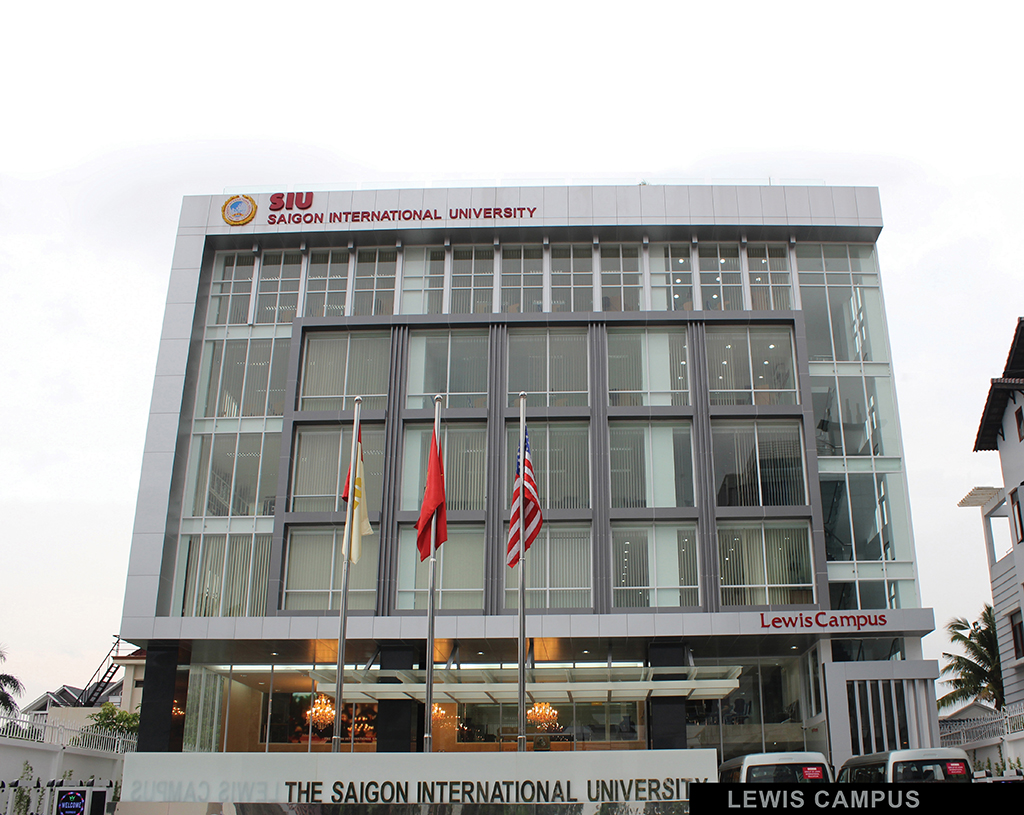
Lewis Campus

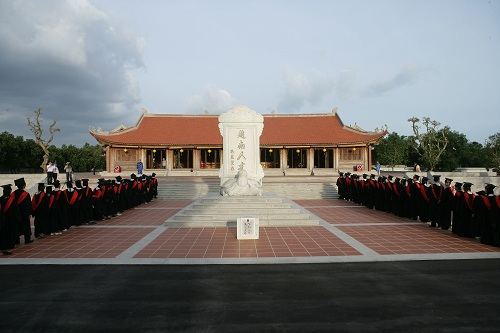
SIU Traditional Park

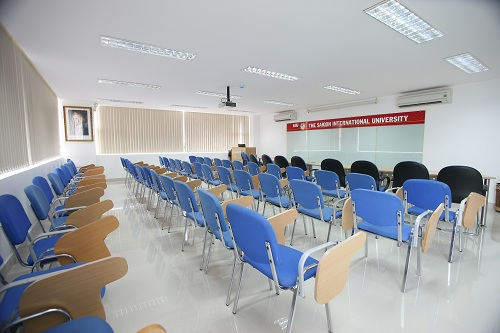

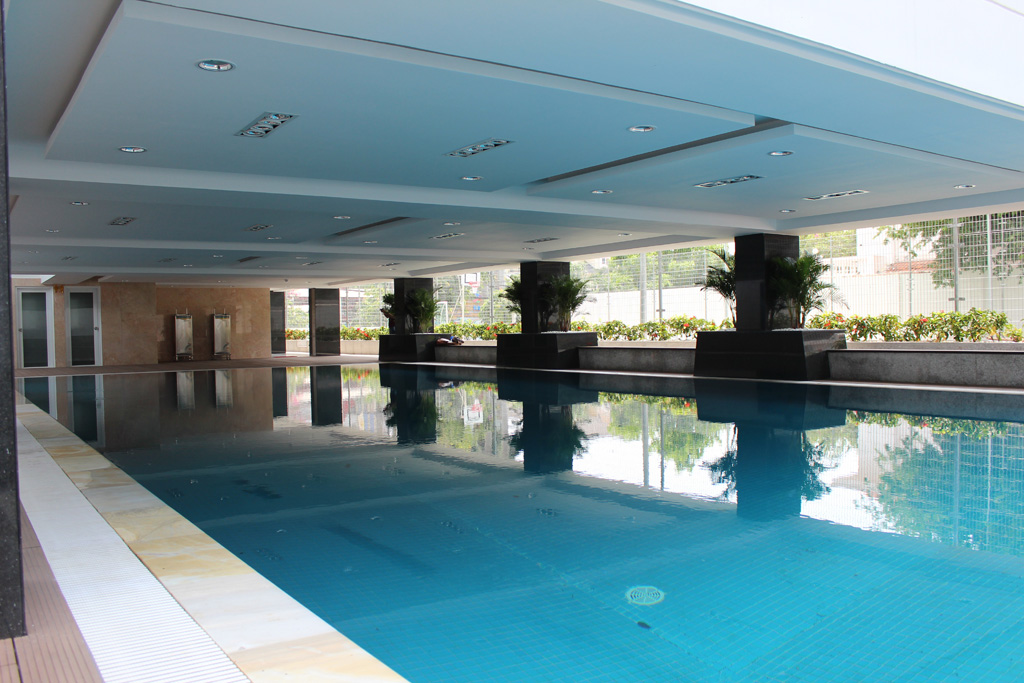
Charles Hickcox Pool

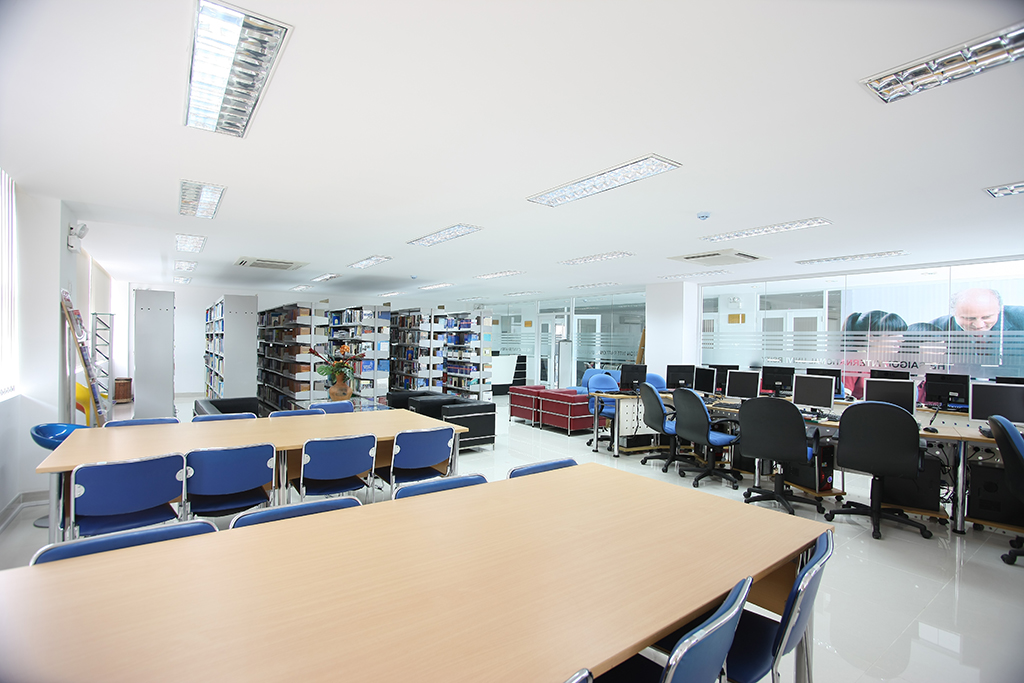
Alexandria Library

In 2006, the founding members of SIU submitted a project of establishing an international private university in Ho Chi Minh City to Ho Chi Minh City Department of Education and Training, Ho Chi Minh City People's Committee, the Ministry of Education and Training of Vietnam and the Prime Minister’s office.

On September 24, 2007, the Prime Minister signed a decision on the establishment of SIU, offering bachelor and diploma programs in the fields of economics, technical science and language.

== Academic profile ==
SIU offers bachelor, diploma and diploma to bachelor programs in the fields of economics, technical science and language. Currently, SIU offers 29 academic majors in various disciplines. The programs of SIU are recognized by Vietnamese Ministry of Education and Training. Students who follow the program taught in English language will be accepted to transfer to SIU's partner universities for the last two years to complete their bachelor's degree. Graduates of SIU will be eligible to pursue further education to earn an MA or a PhD at other universities in the United States, the UK, Australia, Canada etc.

== Facilities ==
SIU operates from five campuses: Lewis Hall, Eliot Hall, Mc Carthy Hall, Fleming Hall and Đông A Hall located in An Khanh Ward, Ho Chi Minh City with the total area of nearly 9,000 m^{2} including a swimming pool, facilities for teaching, learning and relaxation such as wireless Internet, library resources, e-library, laboratories, meeting halls, lecture halls, theaters, classrooms, film studio, music room, multi - purpose play field, gym, theatre, relax areas and much more.

In addition, SIU built a 5 ha (12 acres) traditional park at Dong Nai Province which has been in operation since November 2012.

SIU traditional park serves as a place for graduation ceremonies, traditional and cultural education and outdoor activities.

== Library system ==
SIU library plays an important part in the school's organization. It's considered to be the second learning area for students, where students, lecturers and staff can find various materials and diverse information. It greatly contributes to improving teaching quality at the university.

SIU library has textbooks, reference books, bachelor's theses, scientific research works, dictionaries and magazines…which are neatly and logically arranged. They are also cataloged into different specific areas including: Textbooks, Economics and Business, Computer Science, Dictionary, Fiction, Culture - Tourism, Magazines, etc..

The e-library is run effectively with a modern computer system, high tech equipment and high speed Internet access. The enormous material sources best serve the demands of students, professors and staff, including e-documents, audio files, videos and photos…

== International recognition ==
SIU is the first university in Vietnam — and among the few in Asia — to receive international accreditation in the field of Business from the Accreditation Council for Business Schools and Programs (ACBSP), USA, and is a member of the Association to Advance Collegiate Schools of Business (AACSB). The university maintains partnerships with prestigious international institutions such as Suffolk University and Truman State University (USA), Buckinghamshire New University (UK), Ritsumeikan University and Asia Pacific University (Japan), among others.

SIU became the first university in Vietnam to receive accreditation from the International Accreditation Council for Business Education (IACBE), USA, in April 2020.

The Bachelor of Science in Computer Science program at Saigon International University (SIU) was accredited in 2024 by the Computing Accreditation Commission (CAC) of ABET, USA. SIU’s Computer Science program earned ABET accreditation from its very first evaluation. This recognition affirms that the program meets the essential international standards to prepare graduates to enter the global workforce in the critical STEM fields.
