= Ba Son Bridge =

Ba Son Bridge Cầu Ba Son
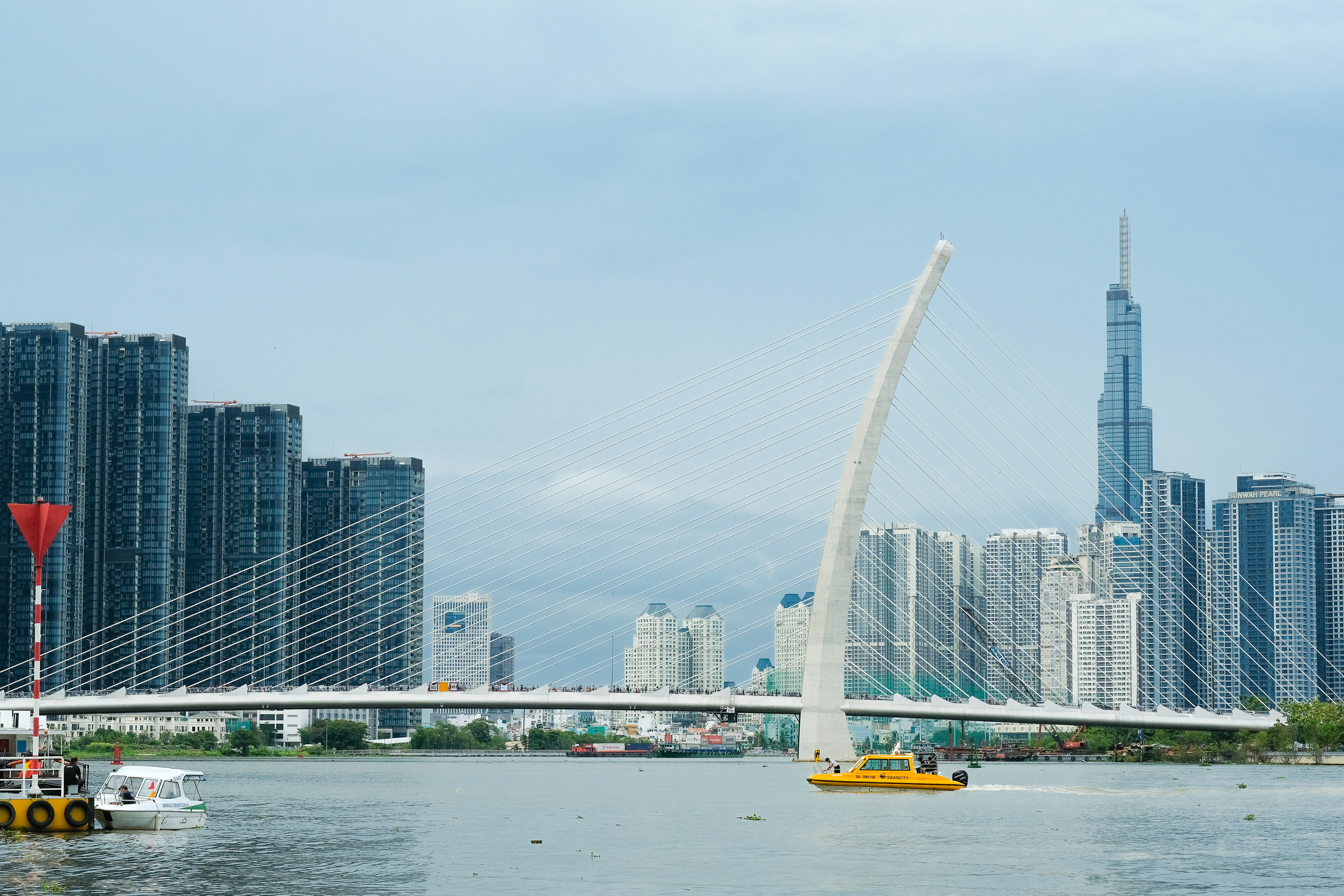
- Ba Son Bridge viewed from Bach Dang Quay
- Coordinates: 10°46′46″N 106°42′37″E
- Crosses: Saigon River
- Locale: Ho Chi Minh City
- Begins: Tôn Đức Thắng Boulevard, Saigon
- Ends: R12 Street, An Khánh
- Named for: Ba Son Shipyard

Characteristics
- Design: Cable-stayed bridge
- Total length: 885.7 meters (2,906 ft)
- Height: 113 meters (371 ft)
- Longest span: 200 meters (660 ft)
- Clearance below: 11 meters (36 ft)

History
- Opened: April 28, 2022

Location
- Interactive map of Ba Son Bridge

The Ba Son Bridge (Vietnamese: Cầu Ba Son), formerly temporary named as Thủ Thiêm 2 Bridge, is a 6-lane bridge in Ho Chi Minh City, Vietnam that opened in 2022. The bridge crosses the Saigon River to link Saigon and An Khánh.

The bridge was named after the former historical Ba Son Shipyard next to the bridge, now known as the Ba Son Complex. The Ba Son station of the Ho Chi Minh City Metro Line 1 near the bridge in District 1 opened on 22 December 2024.

Ho Chi Minh City’s first subway line open, The Ba Son Bridge estimates to receives over ~62,000 daily commuters.
