= International School Ho Chi Minh City =

Coordinates: 10.805563°N 106.734779°E

Location
- *1 Xuan Thuy St., Thao Dien, Thu Duc City, HCMC (Secondary Campus): 28 Vo Truong Toan St., An Phu, Thu Duc City, HCMC (Primary Campus); Ho Chi Minh City; Vietnam

Information
- Type: International School
- Established: 1993
- School district: Thu Duc City/Formerly District 2
- Head teacher: Tom Pearl
- Grades: EE2–12
- Enrollment: 1300
- Colour: Blue
- Mascot: Rhino and Stingray (Aquatics)
- Rival: British International School Ho Chi Minh City
- Tell: +84 (28) 3898 9100
- Website: ishcmc.com

The International School Ho Chi Minh City (ISHCMC) is an International School located in Thu Duc City, or formerly District 2 of Ho Chi Minh City, Vietnam. The school is owned and operated by Cognita Asia.

International School Ho Chi Minh City is the first international school in HCMC and currently enrolls 1,300 students aged 2 to 18 years old from more than 50 countries. Their uniform is a white polo shirt for 11/12 grade, and a navy polo shirt for 6-10 grade, with a gray skirt or shorts. A blue and white shirt and shorts are the uniform in primary, also used for the PE uniform in secondary. They provide alternate clothing for those with religious requirements.

International School Ho Chi Minh City is fully accredited by the International Baccalaureate Organization (IBO).

International School Ho Chi Minh City has 2 campus. Primary campus is located in An Phu Ward, Thu Duc City, HCMC open for students from ages 2 – 11 years old. In 2018 they opened a new secondary campus in Thao Dien Ward, HCMC, 5 km away from the Primary campus for students from 12 – 18 years old.

== History ==
The school first opened in 1993 as International Grammar School located in District 3, Ho Chi Minh City, Vietnam. It's the first international school in Ho Chi Minh City and was renamed "International School Ho Chi Minh City", and moved to its current location in District 2 in 1997.

In 2011, International School Ho Chi Minh City joined the Cognita Schools Group, a group of over 60 schools worldwide.

In 2018, International School Ho Chi Minh City opened a new Secondary campus in Thao Dien Ward, Thu Duc City, Ho Chi Minh City, Vietnam.

== Curriculum ==
International School Ho Chi Minh City provides International Baccalaureate (IB) programmes in Vietnam:

Primary Years Programme to students in Early Explore 2 to Grade 5 (ages 2 to 12 years).

Middle Years Programme for students in grades 6 to 10 (ages 12 to 16 years).

IB Diploma Programme or certificates for students in Grade 11 to 12 (ages 16 to 18 years).
