= Thủ Thiêm Bridge =

Thủ Thiêm Bridge Cầu Thủ Thiêm
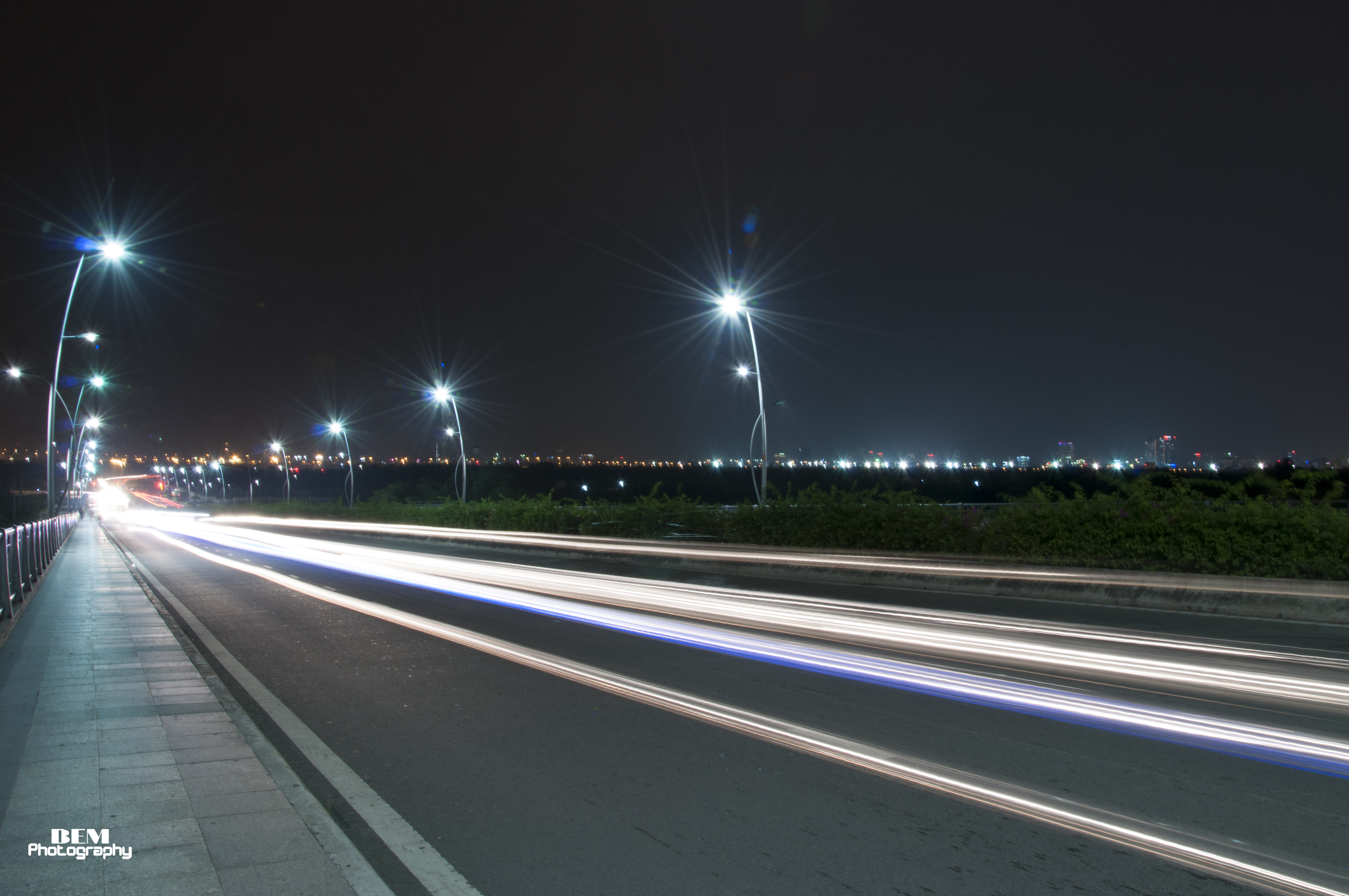
- Thủ Thiêm Bridge
- Coordinates: 10°47′9″N 106°43′6″E
- Locale: Ho Chi Minh City

History
- Opened: 2008; 18 years ago

Location
- Interactive map of Thủ Thiêm Bridge

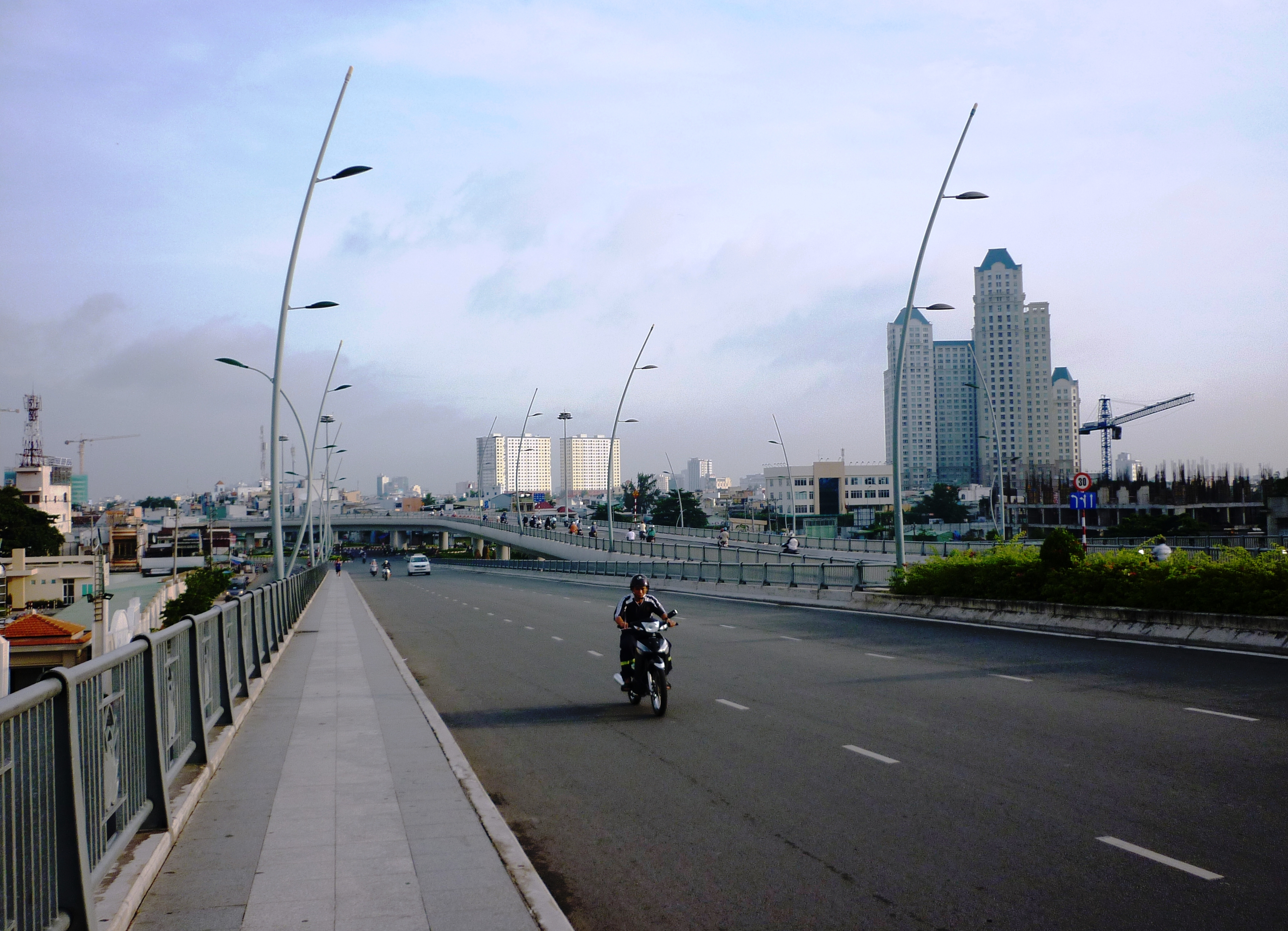
Thủ Thiêm Bridge

Thủ Thiêm Bridge is a 6-lane bridge in Ho Chi Minh City, the largest city of Vietnam, opened in 2008. The bridge links District 2 with Bình Thạnh District, near downtown District 1. This bridge is an important link between existing downtown of Ho Chi Minh City with Thu Thiem New Urban Area. The cost estimate for construction of the bridge was US$60 million, implemented by a consortium of Vietnamese contractors. The progress was delayed due to delay in land compensation – a big problem in project management faced by many investors in Vietnam.
