= Tăng Nhơn Phú =

Tăng Nhơn Phú Phường Tăng Nhơn Phú Tăng Phú, Phong Phú, Tân Nhơn, Hiệp Phú, Tân Phú
- Ward
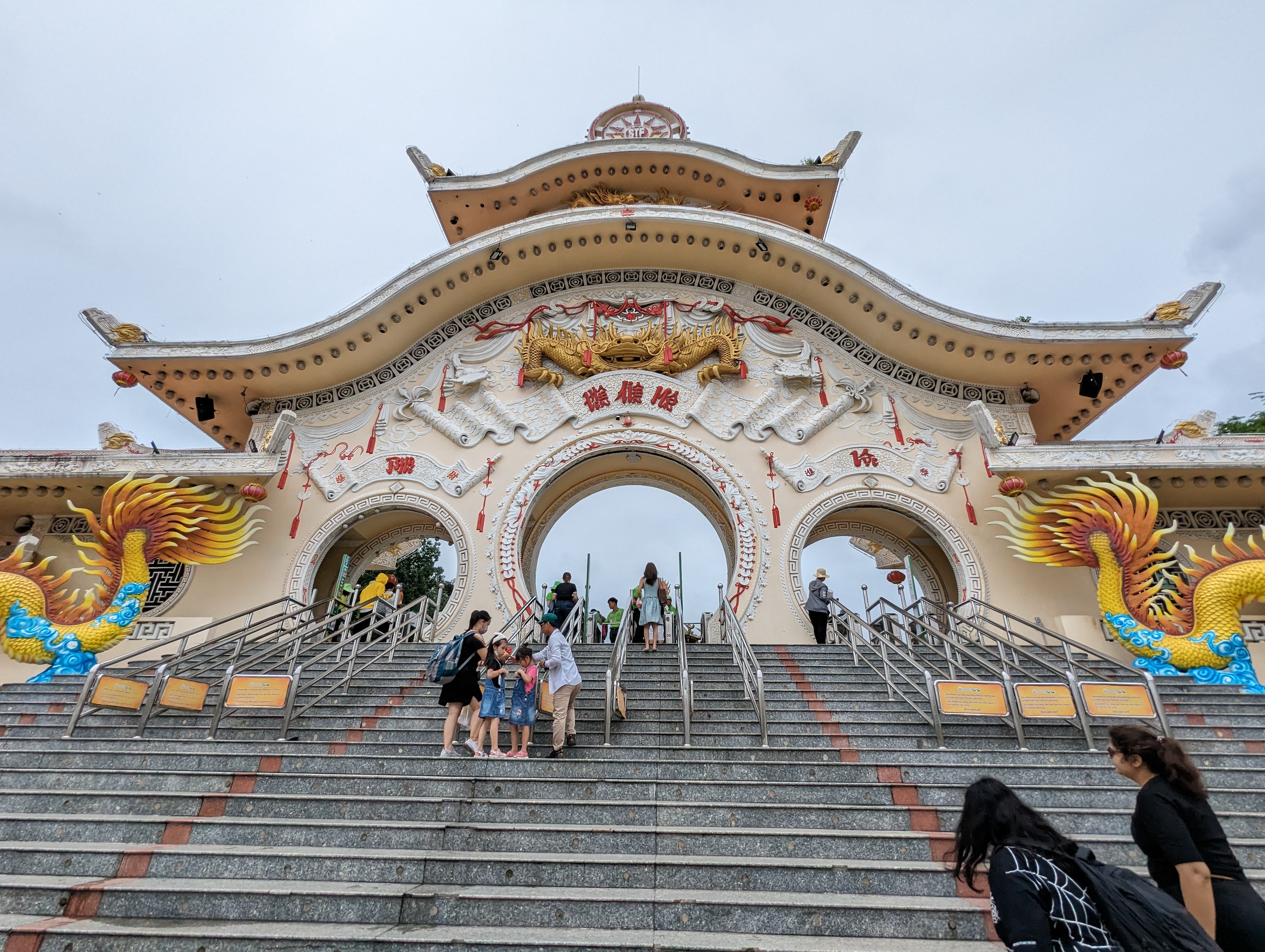
- Suối Tiên Theme Park
- Interactive map of Tăng Nhơn Phú
- Coordinates: 10°50′42″N 106°47′16″E
- Country: Vietnam
- Municipality: Ho Chi Minh City
- Established: June 16, 2025

Area
  - Total: 6.37 sq mi (16.51 km^{2})

Population (2024)
  - Total: 208,233
  - Density: 32,670/sq mi (12,610/km^{2})
- Time zone: UTC+07:00 (Indochina Time)
- Administrative code: 26842

Tăng Nhơn Phú (Vietnamese: Phường Tăng Nhơn Phú) is a ward of Ho Chi Minh City, Vietnam. It is one of the 168 new wards, communes and special zones of the city following the reorganization in 2025.

== Geography ==
Tăng Nhơn Phú is about 16 km away to the northeast of Saigon, located at the central of former city of Thủ Đức. It is bordered by:

- Long Bình to the east by Road No. 400 – Hoàng Hữu Nam Road – Lê Văn Việt Street – Eastern Ring road of SHTP
- Long Trường and Long Phước to the southeast by Trau Trảu creek
- Phước Long to the southwest
- Thủ Đức and Linh Xuân to the northwest by Hanoi Highway.

According to Official Dispatch No. 2896/BNV-CQĐP dated May 27, 2025 of the Ministry of Home Affairs, following the merger, Thủ Đức has a land area of 16.51 km², the population as of December 31, 2024 is 208,233 people, the population density is 12,612 people/km².

== Division ==
Tăng Nhơn Phú ward is divided into 86 quarters, numbered from 1 to 86.

== History ==
On June 16, 2025, the National Assembly Standing Committee issued Resolution No. 1685/NQ-UBTVQH15 on the arrangement of commune-level administrative units of Ho Chi Minh City in 2025 (effective from June 16, 2025). Accordingly, the entire land area and population of Tân Phú, Hiệp Phú, Tăng Nhơn Phú A, Tăng Nhơn Phú B wards and part of Long Thạnh Mỹ ward of the former Thủ Đức city will be integrated into a new ward named Tăng Nhơn Phú (Clause 71, Article 1).

== Economy ==
=== Manufacture ===
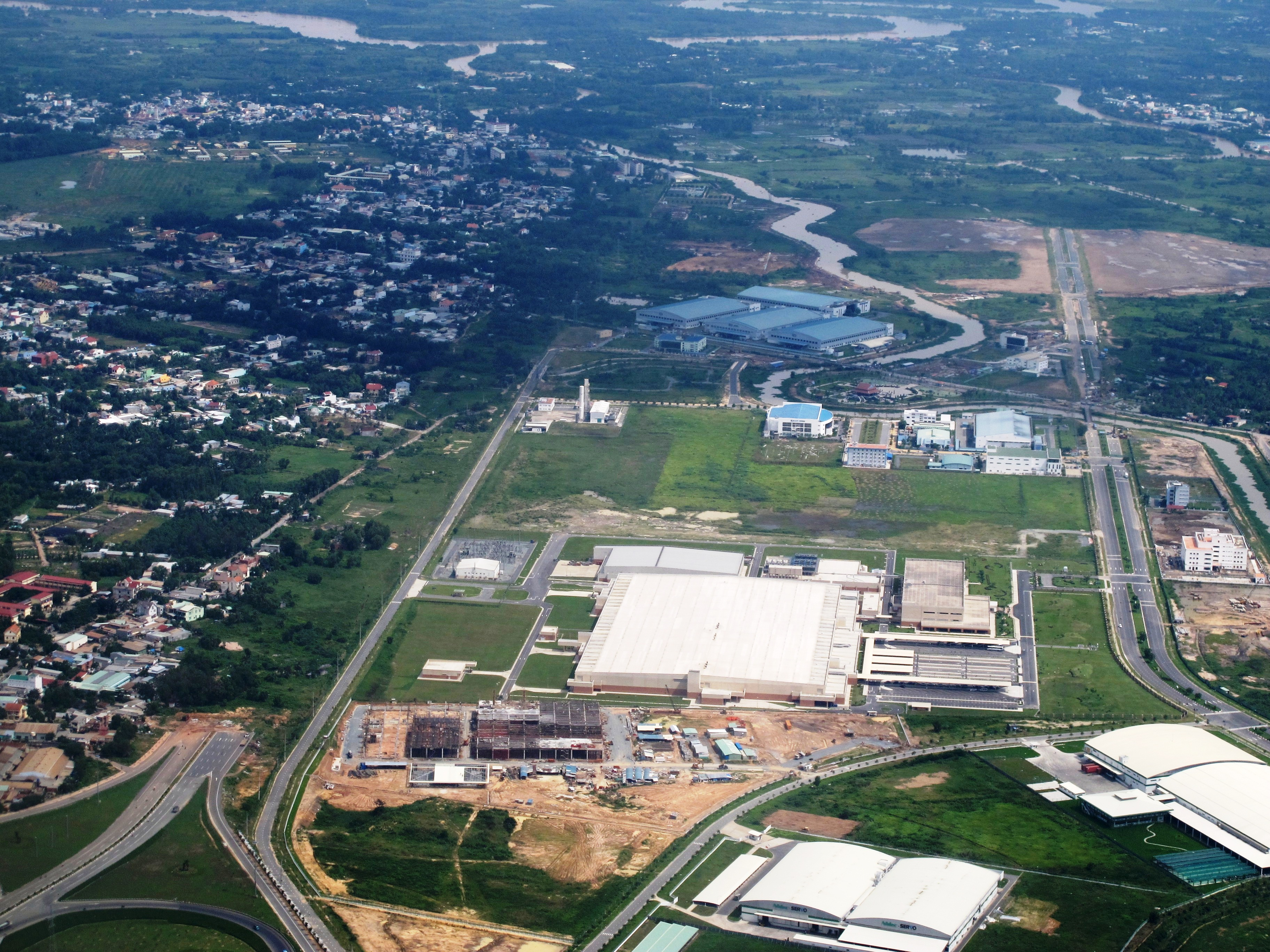
SHTP seen from above

The most prominent economic activity in the ward is manufacturing, given that it is home to the Saigon Hi-Tech Park (SHTP), a tech hub where several large international enterprises have established their presence here, notably:

- Japanese Nidec (TSE:65940, NYSE:NJ, hard disk drive motors): with multiple factories under Nidec, Nidec Copal and Nidec Sankyo flagships and total investment of US $500 million for a planned 20,000 workforce
- US Intel (NASDAQ:INTC): with US $1 billion registered investment to build the largest chip assembly & test plant in the world
- French Air Liquide (EPA:AI): gases for industry, health and the environment
- Danish Sonion: miniature and hearing components who employs more than 2,000 workforce in SHTP
- US Jabil (NYSE:JBL): electronic supplier
- Italian Datalogic (STAR:DAL.MI): bar codes readers.

In total 26 companies were in operations in 2011, employing more than 11,000 employees and a total registered investment of US $2 billions. Some notable domestic enterprises here are: FPT Software, FPT Telecom International, Mobile World Investment Corporation.

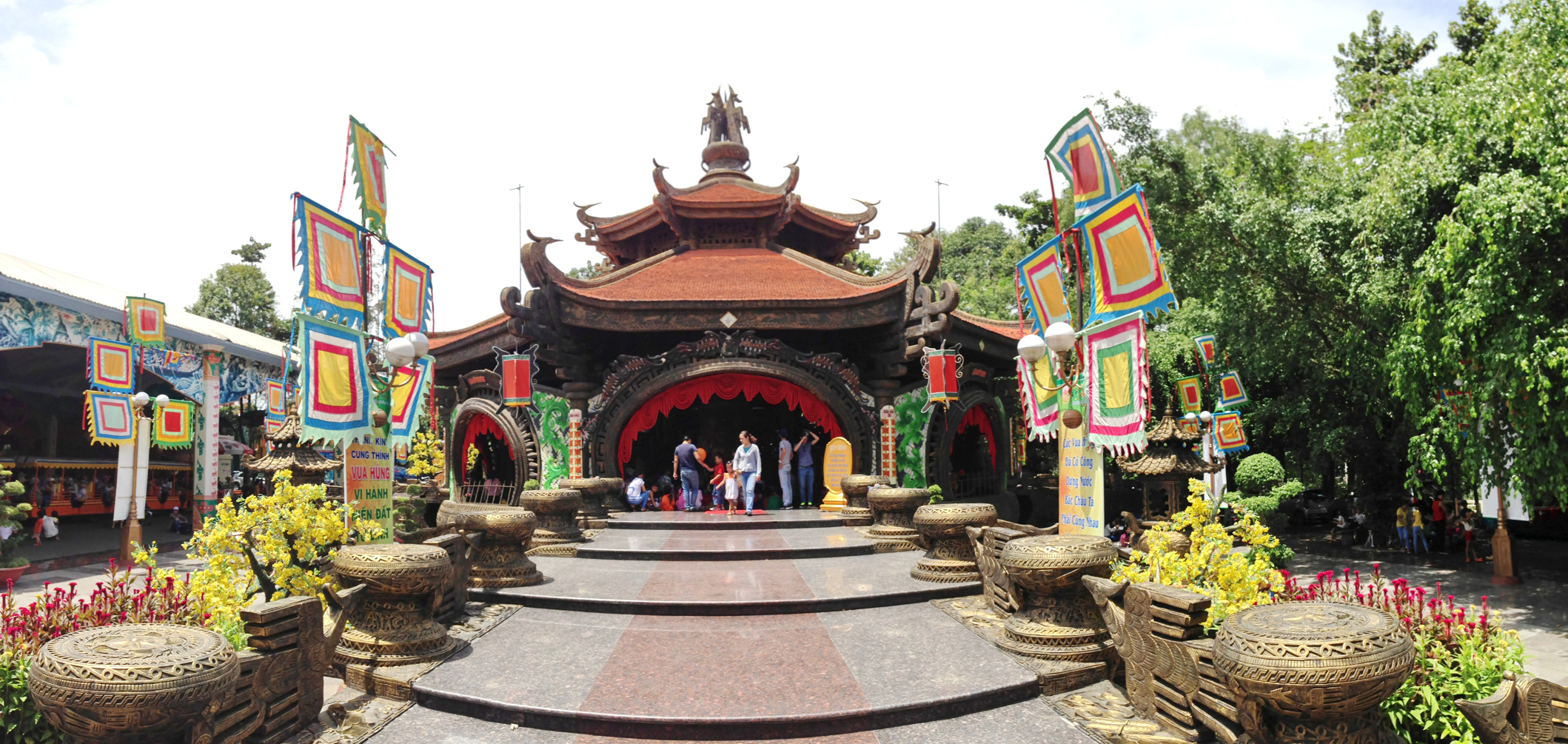
The Hùng King Temple in Suối Tiên Theme Park

=== Tourism ===
Besides manufacturing, tourism is also a notable aspect of the ward's economy, as it boasts the Suối Tiên Theme Park that opened in 1995. Each weekend, the park welcomes approximately 2,000-3,000 visitors; during holidays, this number can reach 15,000-17,000 visitors per day. Compared to its heyday, this number is still not comparable, but compared to many other tourist destinations in the region, Suối Tiên is still considered to have considerable appeal.
