= Thủ Đức =

Thủ Đức may refer to:

- Thủ Đức, Ho Chi Minh City, a ward of Ho Chi Minh City, Vietnam
- Thủ Đức (city): a former municipal city of Ho Chi Minh City
- Thủ Đức district: a former urban district of Ho Chi Minh City
- Thủ Đức: a former rural district of Ho Chi Minh City that was dissolved into urban district of 2, 9 and Thủ Đức district in 1997. Now is the city of Thủ Đức
- Thủ Đức town: a former town and capital seat of former Thủ Đức rural district that was dissolved into entirely wards of Bình Thọ, Linh Chiểu and part of Trường Thọ, Linh Tây of Thủ Đức (as urban district then or municipal city now) in 1997. Then known as the downtown of Thủ Đức city, and now is ward of Ho Chi Minh City
- Thủ Đức market: a traditional central market located at the central Thủ Đức district
- Thủ Đức creek: a waterway go through the central Thủ Đức that flows into Saigon River
- Thủ Đức station: a metro station of Ho Chi Minh City Metro, served for only Line 1, located near the Thủ Đức intersection on Hanoi Highway (now is Võ Nguyên Giáp Boulevard)

== See also ==
- Thủ Đức Military Academy
