= Phú Hiệp =

Phú Hiệp may refer to several commune-level subdivisions in Vietnam, including:

- Phú Hiệp, Huế, a ward of Huế
- Phú Hiệp, An Giang, a commune of Phú Tân District, An Giang Province
- Phú Hiệp, Đồng Tháp, a commune of Tam Nông District, Đồng Tháp Province

== See also ==
- Hiệp Phú, a ward of District 9, Ho Chi Minh City
- Tuy Hòa Base Camp also known as Phú Hiệp Army Airfield
