= Saigon Hi-Tech Park =

Coordinates: 10°50′20″N 106°48′41″E

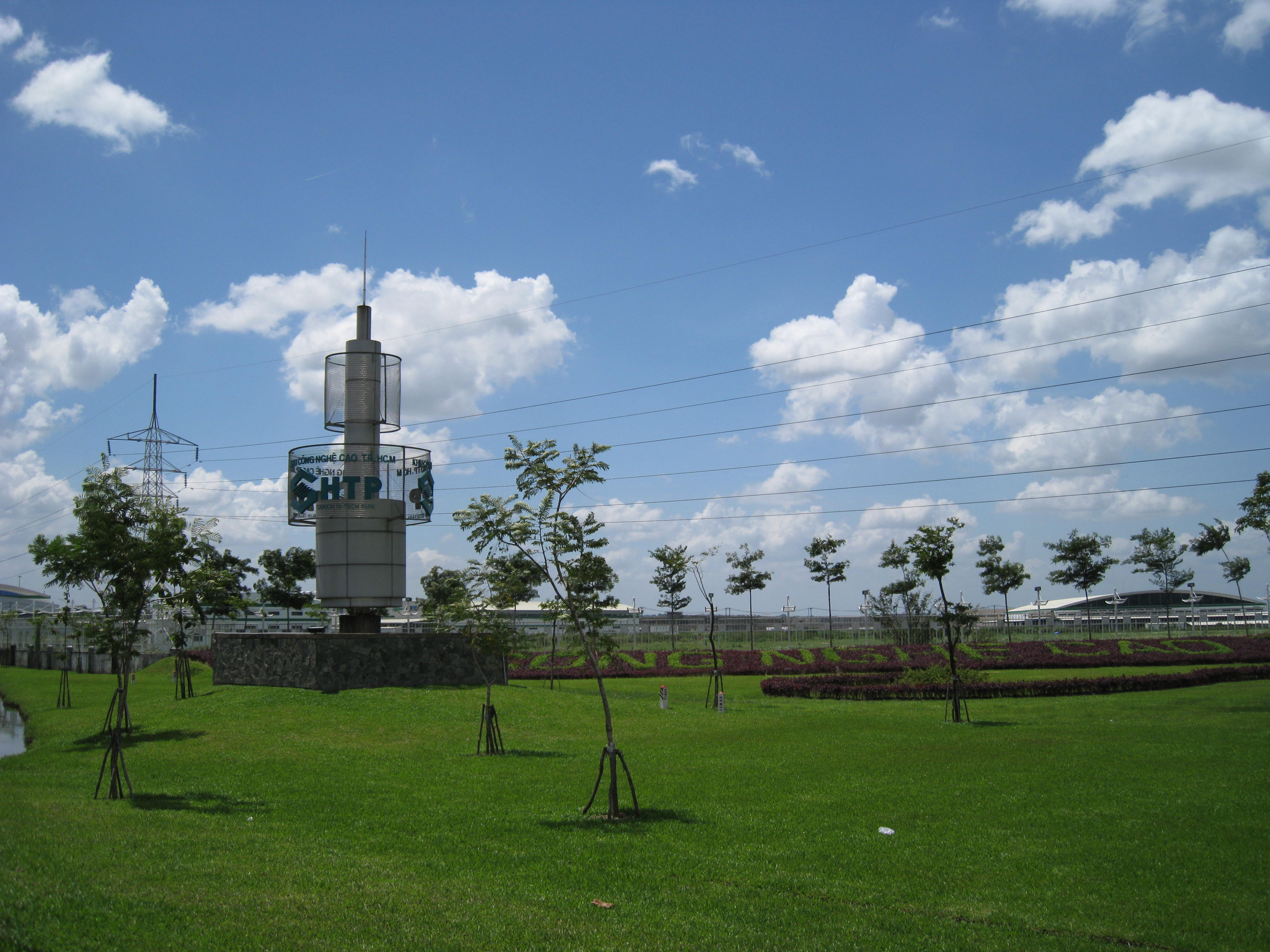
- Saigon Hi-Tech Park in 2009
- Interactive map of Saigon Hi-Tech Park
- Location: Tăng Nhơn Phú, Ho Chi Minh City, Vietnam
- Opening date: October 29, 2002; 24 years ago
- Developer: Ho Chi Minh City People's Council and People's Committee
- Manager: Management Board of Saigon Hi-Tech Park
- Public transit: L1 High Tech Park station
- Website: SHTP

Official logo

The Saigon Hi-Tech Park (Vietnamese: Khu Công nghệ cao Thành phố Hồ Chí Minh; abbr.: SHTP) is a park for high technology enterprises located in Tăng Nhơn Phú, 15 km from the east of downtown Ho Chi Minh City, opposite to Thu Duc University Village, along the Hà Nội Highway and on the Line 1 of the Ho Chi Minh City Metro with the High Tech Park station. The park covers an area of 326 ha (95% utilised) and is currently being expanded to 913 ha. High-tech investors are given preferential treatments here with land leases and taxation, as well as support for customs services. On 13 June 2026, the Prime Minister approved the expansion of Saigon Hi-Tech Park (SHTP) through Decision No. 1061/QĐ-TTg, providing the legal framework for developing the new 195 ha expansion area in Long Phước, Ho Chi Minh City as the Science and Technology Park and attracting investment.

== Businesses ==
Several high-tech companies chose SHTP, notably:

- Japanese Nidec (TSE:65940, NYSE:NJ, hard disk drive motors): with multiple factories under Nidec, Nidec Copal and Nidec Sankyo flagships and total investment of US $500 million for a planned 20,000 workforce
- US Intel (NASDAQ:INTC): with US $1 billion registered investment to build the largest chip assembly & test plant in the world
- French Air Liquide (EPA:AI): gases for industry, health and the environment
- Danish Sonion: miniature and hearing components who employs more than 2,000 workforce in SHTP
- US Jabil (NYSE:JBL): electronic supplier
- Italian Datalogic (STAR:DAL.MI): bar codes readers.

In total 26 companies were in operations in 2011, employing more than 11,000 employees and a total registered investment of US $2 billions.

Some companies from Vietnam opened their offices here, notably: FPT Software, FPT Telecom International, Mobile World Investment Corporation, etc.

This park was aimed at promoting Ho Chi Minh City and Vietnam as a hi-tech investor friendly destination. The new phase is focusing on education, bio-technology, start-up incubators, training centres, software, R&D, telecom. This park is one of the hi-tech parks in Vietnam, the other being Hòa Lạc Hi-Tech Park situated in the western outskirts of Hanoi near the Hanoi University of Science and Technology (HUST) and Đà Nẵng Hi-Tech Park in Đà Nẵng.

== Education ==
Several institutes opened or planned to open their campuses here, including:

- Fulbright University Vietnam – SHTP Campus (D1 Road)
- FPT University – Ho Chi Minh City (Lot E2a-7, D1 Road)
- Nguyễn Tất Thành University – Hi-Tech Campus (D2 Road)
- Ho Chi Minh City University of Technology (HUTECH) – Thủ Đức Campus (Hanoi Highway) & Hi-Tech Campus (D1 Road)

== Public transit ==
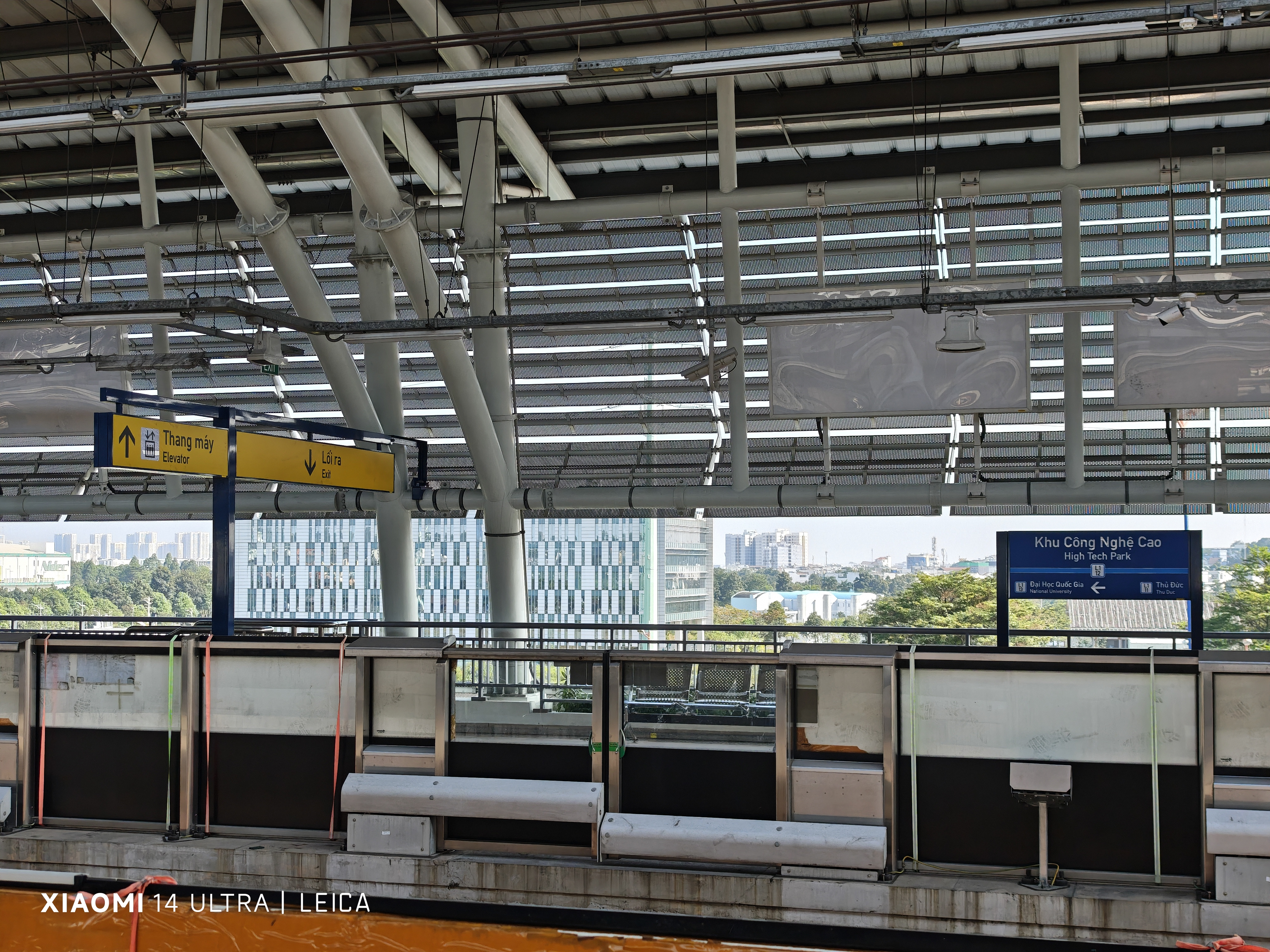
View from the High Tech Park station with the Saigon 1Hub Business Park

The High Tech Park station is a station of Line 1, an east-west axis line connect the park with historic downtown with the east and west side of the city, the line is planned to be extended into 2 branches, with Line 1D branch connects with Bình Dương New City in the north and the other is connects with Long Thanh International Airport to the east. The station is also on Line 10, an outer ring line, a line that connects the suburban area, surround the inner city, some of notable area like Thủ Thiêm New Urban Area, Phú Mỹ Hưng Urban Area, Tân Thuận, Cát Lái.

== See also ==
- Hoa Lac Hi-tech Park
- Danang Hi-tech Park
- Quang Trung Software City
