= Cát Lái =

Cát Lái Phường Cát Lái Thạnh Mỹ Lợi
- Ward
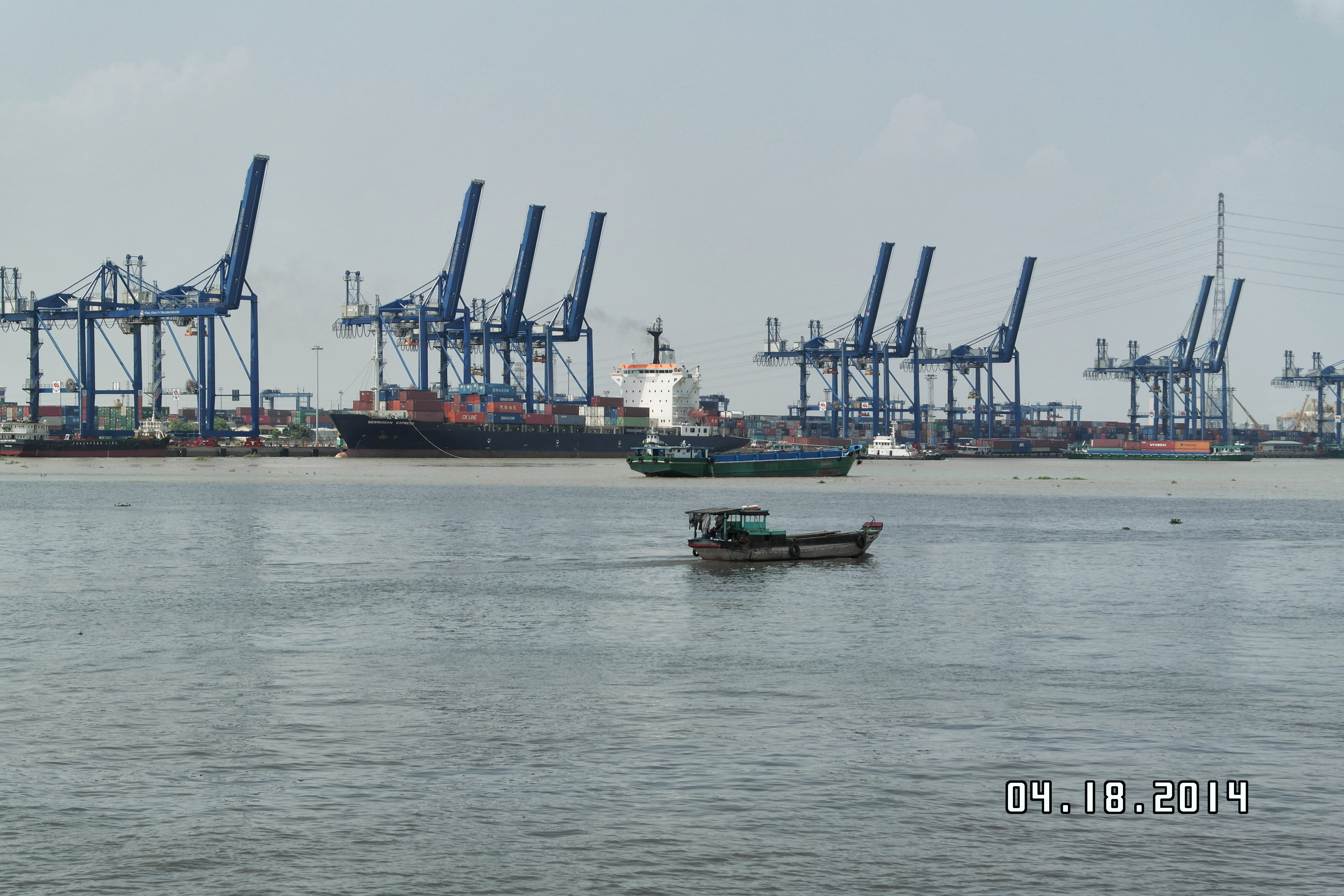
- Cát Lái Port, Vietnam's largest and busiest container port
- Interactive map of Cát Lái
- Coordinates: 10°46′11″N 106°46′59″E
- Country: Vietnam
- Municipality: Ho Chi Minh City
- Established: June 16, 2025

Area
  - Total: 7.59 sq mi (19.65 km^{2})

Population (2024)
  - Total: 68,654
  - Density: 9,049/sq mi (3,494/km^{2})
- Time zone: UTC+07:00 (Indochina Time)
- Administrative code: 27112

Cát Lái (Vietnamese: Phường Cát Lái) is a ward of Ho Chi Minh City, Vietnam. It is one of the 168 new wards, communes and special zones of the city following the reorganization in 2025.

== Geography ==
Cát Lái ward is 8 km to the east of Saigon ward, borders with:

- Đại Phước commune, Đồng Nai to the east by Đồng Nai River
- Tân Thuận ward to the west by là Saigon River
- Phú Thuận ward to the south by Saigon River
- Bình Trưng ward to the north and northwest
- Long Trường ward to the northeast by Bà Cua – Ông Cày Canal

According to Official Letter No. 2896/BNV-CQĐP dated May 27, 2025, from the Ministry of Interior, Cát Lái ward after arrangement has an area of 19.65 km², population as of December 31, 2024 is 68,654 people, population density is 3,493 people/km² (Article 6 of Resolution No. 76/2025/UBTVQH15 dated April 14, 2025, of the Standing Committee of the National Assembly).

== Division ==
Cát Lái ward is divided into 25 quarters: 1, 2, 3, 4, 5, 6, 7, 8, 9, 10, 11, 12, 13, 14, 15, 16, 17, 18, 19, 20, 21, 22, 23, 24, 25.

== History ==
The area of Cát Lái ward before 1997 corresponded to the former Thạnh Mỹ Lợi commune. The village (làng) of Thạnh Mỹ Lợi was formed by merging three villages dating back to the Nguyễn dynasty: Bình Thạnh, Bình Lợi, and Mỹ Thủy.

After 1956, under the government of South Vietnam, the villages were called communes (xã), and Thạnh Mỹ Lợi became a commune in Thủ Đức district, Gia Định province.

After 1975, Thạnh Mỹ Lợi commune belonged to Thủ Đức rural district, Ho Chi Minh City (which is equivalent to the later City of Thủ Đức).

On January 6, 1997, the Government issued Decree No. 03-CP. Accordingly:

- Transfer Thạnh Mỹ Lợi commune to the newly established District 2, Ho Chi Minh City.
- Establish Cát Lái ward based on 669 hectares of natural area and 6,567 people of Thạnh Mỹ Lợi commune.
- Establish Thạnh Mỹ Lợi ward based on the remaining 1.283 hectares of natural area and 7,091 people of Thạnh Mỹ Lợi commune.

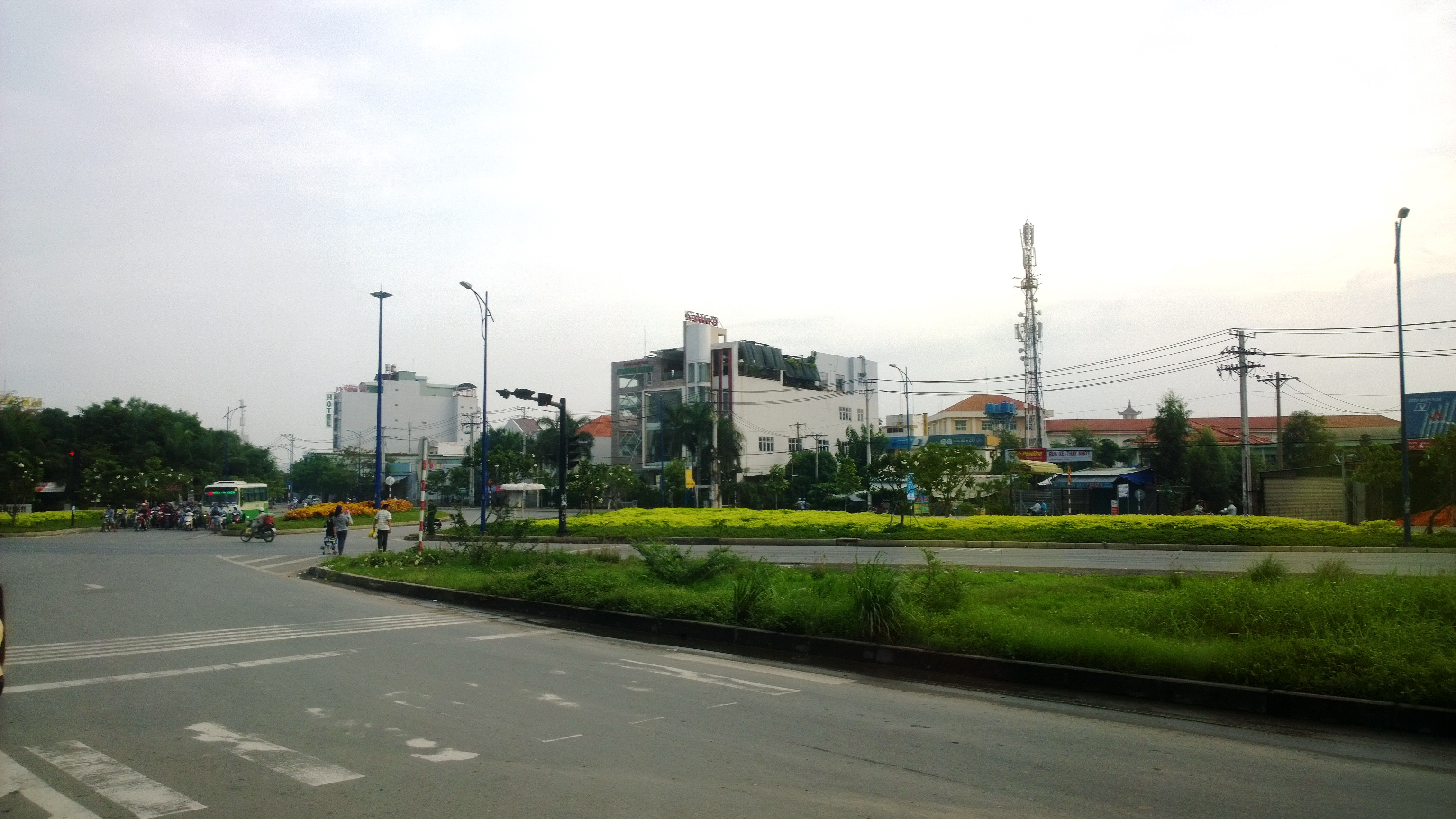
Đồng Văn Cống Road, a gateway to the Cát Lái Port

On December 9, 2020, Standing Committee of the National Assembly of Vietnam issued Resolution 1111/NQ-UBTVQH14 on the establishment of the Municipal city of Thủ Đức based on the merger of the entire area and population of District 2, District 9, and Thủ Đức District; Cát Lái Ward, and Thạnh Mỹ Lợi Ward, were formerly part of Thủ Đức City on March 1, 2021.

On June 16, 2025, the National Assembly Standing Committee issued Resolution No. 1685/NQ-UBTVQH15 on the arrangement of commune-level administrative units of Ho Chi Minh City in 2025 (effective from June 16, 2025). Accordingly, the entire land area and population of Thạnh Mỹ Lợi and Cát Lái wards of the former Thủ Đức city will be integrated into a new ward named Cát Lái (Clause 75, Article 1).

== Economics ==
As Cát Lái Port is the busiest port of Vietnam, logistics plays a major role of the ward economics, and this also led to the development of manufacturing industries with the Cát Lái II Industrial Park always in a high occupancy rate.

Meanwhile, the Thạnh Mỹ Lợi area in western Cát Lái, is developed as affluent residents area with hospitality and F&B service is well-developed here, thanks to its location near the East–West Highway that easy to access Thủ Thiêm New Urban Area, Central Saigon area. This area also serves as the administrative center of the current Cát Lái ward, formerly the administrative center of the former District 2 and then the former Thủ Đức City.

== Housing ==
Thạnh Mỹ Lợi residential area is known as one of the Ho Chi Minh City's new affluent area, along with the Bình Trưng – An Phú, Thủ Thiêm, Thảo Điền – An Khánh, and Phú Mỹ Hưng urban area, featuring high-end real estate projects as well as townhouses and villas with some of the highest prices in the city. The residential planning area is covered by Đồng Văn Cống Road, Võ Chí Công Road (Ring Road 2), and the Saigon River with part of Mai Chí Thọ Boulevard (including part of Bình Trưng ward with notable project is the Diamond Island by Kusto Home from Singapore).

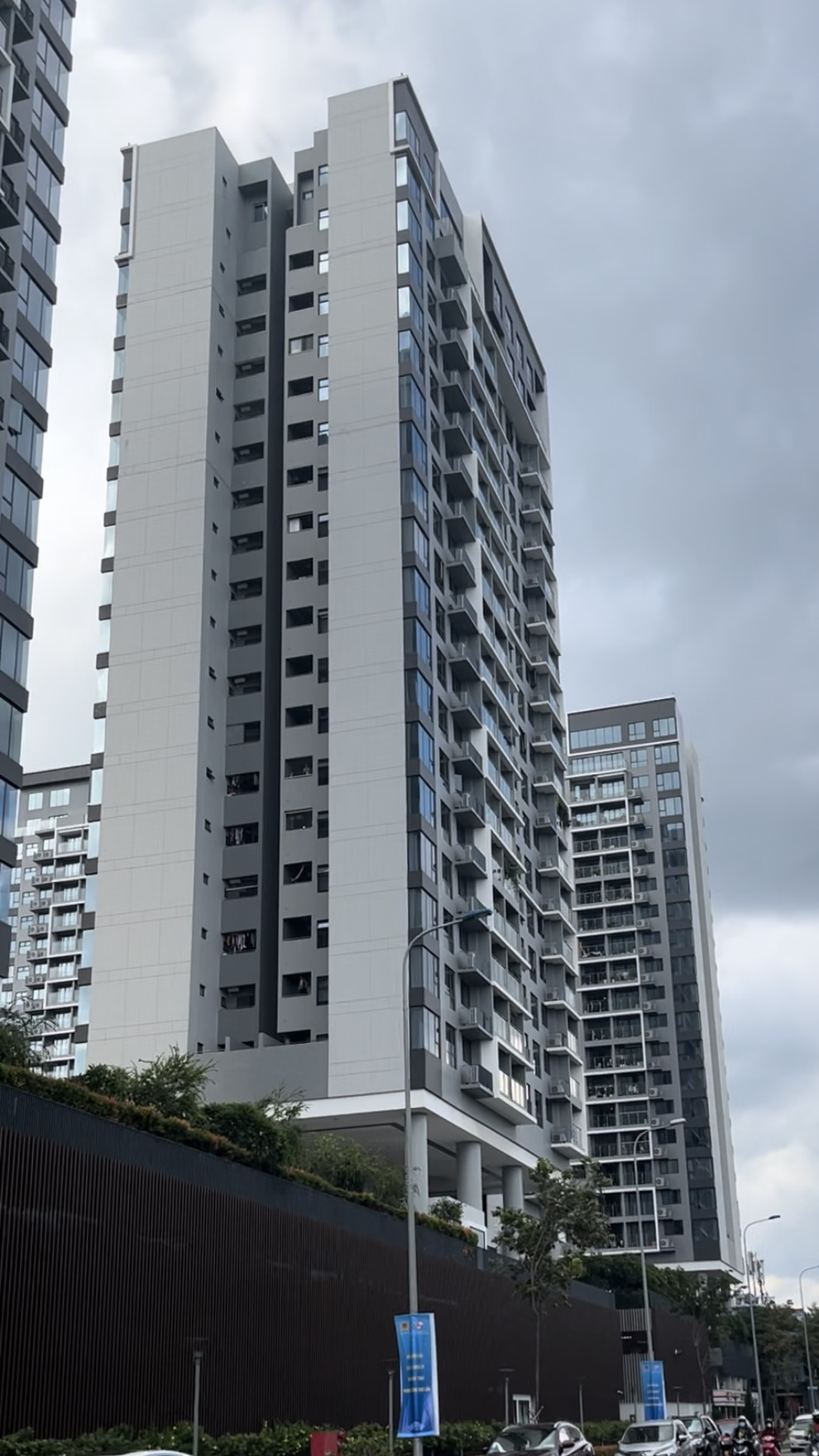
One Verandah

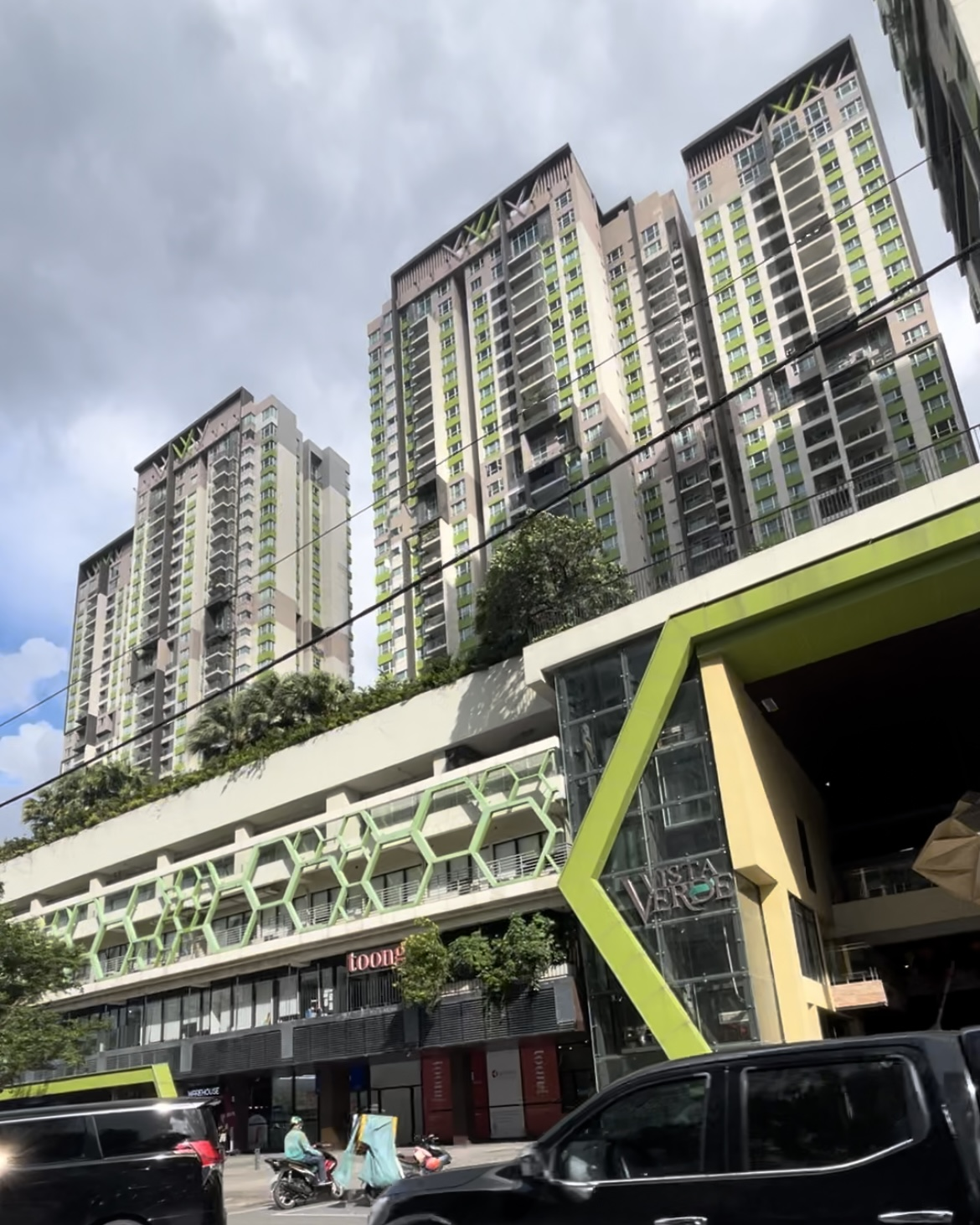
Vista Verde

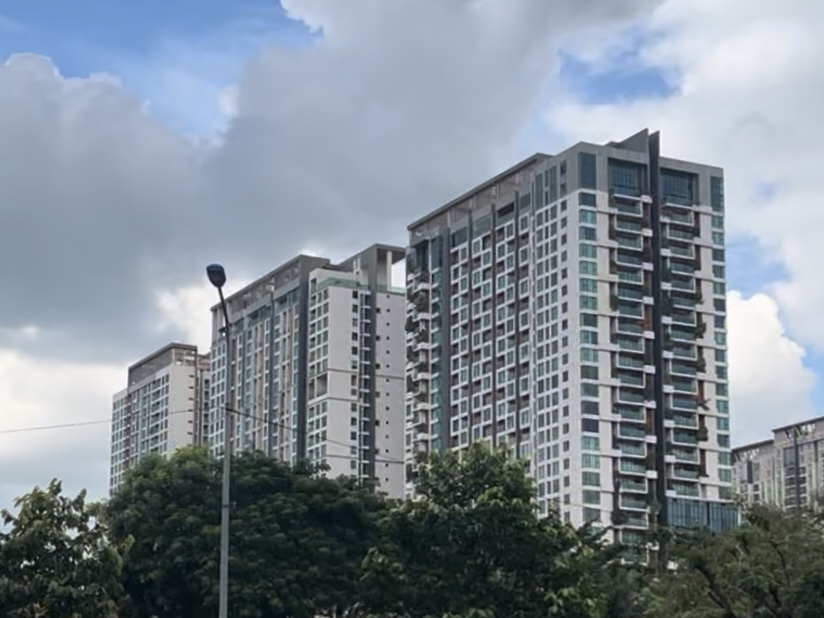
Feliz en Vista

Some notable real estate companies have their projects here are: Maeda Corporation (Waterina Suites), Mapletree Investments (One Verandah), CapitaLand (D2eight Shophouses, Define, Vista Verde, Feliz en Vista; the latter one is featuring Somerset Feliz Ho Chi Minh City Service apartment by The Ascott Limited)...

The former Cát Lái ward area is also gradually developing with a well-planned Cát Lái residential area right next to Cát Lái Port with more affordable price compare to Thạnh Mỹ Lợi, the Thủ Thiêm Green House Apartment in Cát Lái is one of the subsidized housing project in the city. Some several prominent public buildings are also placed here such as the High People's Court at Ho Chi Minh City and the Ho Chi Minh City University of Management and Technology.
