= DotB =

Vietnamese technology company

- Industry: Education technology
- Founded: 2018; 8 years ago (Ho Chi Minh City)
- Founder: Huỳnh Đức Huy
- Headquarters: Ho Chi Minh City, Vietnam

DotB is a Vietnamese technology company that provides management and digital transformation solutions for the education sector. Founded in 2018, the company is headquartered in Ho Chi Minh City. In 2023, DotB became one of the three founding members of the Vietnam Innovative Education Alliance, a network of education technology startup projects established by the High-Tech Business Incubator of Ho Chi Minh City.

DotB develops an ecosystem of technology products that optimize management processes in the education field. In 2023, DotB adopted CMC Cloud computing in its system. DotB's software can manage teaching and learning activities, update student information, and connect with teachers. As of 2023, DotB has successfully implemented its solutions in over 100 training centers across Vietnam.

== Services ==
DotB provides three core technology solutions, supporting educational organizations in managing academic affairs and interacting with students, parents, and learners:

- DotB EMS (Education Management System): Combining CRM (Customer Relationship Management) and SIS (Student Information System) functionalities, this platform helps educational institutions optimize their enrollment processes and manage student information from enrollment to graduation.
- DotB SEA (Student Engagement Application): A digital communication tool that connects schools with parents and students. This app offers various management features such as grade updates, progress reports, performance evaluations, online communication, and more.
- DotB METRIKAL (Work Management App): A work management app that integrates reporting tools and task tracking to optimize time management and ensure internal operations run efficiently. DotB METRIKAL also supports planning and resource allocation for businesses.
