= Lê Phát An =

Vietnamese business owner (1868 – 1946)

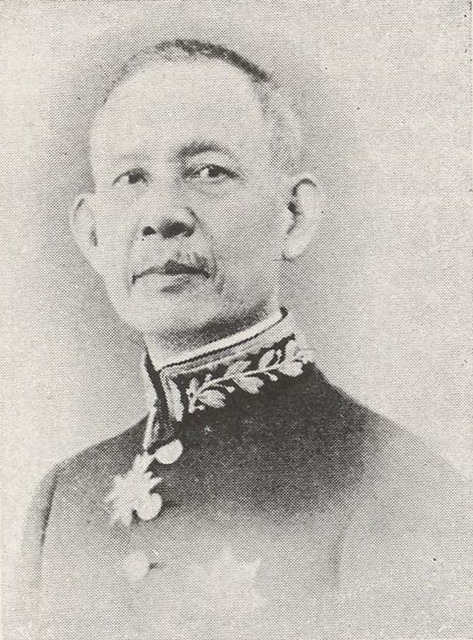
- Born: Denis Lê Phát An; 12 December 1868; Bình Lập village, Thạnh Hội Thượng commune, Tân An province
- Died: 17 September 1946 (aged 77); Saint Paul Nursing Home, Saigon
- Burial place: Hạnh Thông Tây Church
- Occupation: Business owner
- Known for: Contributions to the construction of Hạnh Thông Tây Church
- Title: Knight of the Grand Cross of Saint Sylvester (1927), Baron Lạc Sơn (1943), Officer of the Légion d'honneur
- Spouse: Anna Trần Thị Thơ (1872-1932)
- Parent(s): Philippe Lê Phát Đạt (1838-1900) and Agnes Huỳnh Thị Tài (1845-1920)

Lê Phát An (chữ nho: 黎發安; 12 December 1868 – 17 September 1946) was a Vietnamese business owner in the 1930s–1940s in Cochinchina. He was the son of Lê Phát Đạt, known as Huyện Sỹ, one of the major tycoons in Saigon during the last years of the French Indochina.

== Early life ==
Lê Phát An was born on 12 December 1868 in Bình Lập, Tân An, to Philippe Lê Phát Đạt and Agnes Huỳnh Thị Tài, the third of their nine children. His Christian name was Denis. In 1883, he was sent by his family to study at École de Sainte Marie in Marseille and then continued at Lycée Saint-Charles.

His family included several siblings, such as Marie Lê Thị Bình (1879–1978), Jean Baptiste Lê Phát Thanh (1864–1948), Pierre Lê Phát Vĩnh (1878–1957), and Nicolas Lê Phát Tân (1860–1949).

According to contemporary accounts, although the children grew up in affluent circumstances, the strict education provided by their parents encouraged them to become knowledgeable and to develop the family's economic enterprises. The eldest son Lê Phát Thanh, who managed the rubber and coffee plantations, also opened a timber factory in Nghệ An; Lê Phát Tân managed lands in his hometown of Tân An and the rubber plantation in Long Thành; Lê Phát Vĩnh managed assets in France and Belgium, and opened the Lê Phát weaving company in Cầu Kho. Lê Thị Bình and her husband, Nguyễn Hữu Hào managed fields in Long Thạnh Mỹ and the Blao tea plantation. Lê Phát An was also the maternal uncle of Empress Nam Phương, daughter of Maria Lê Thị Bình. Since Lê Phát An had no children, they treated Nguyễn Hữu Thị Lan as their own. During her studies in France, they sponsored their niece. In 1934, on the occasion of marrying his niece to Huế as Empress, Phát An gave Nguyễn Hữu Thị Lan 1 million dong in cash, equivalent to 20,000 taels of gold as dowry.

== Career ==
After graduating with a Baccalauréat, he returned home in 1887 and took over his father's business. An was also entrusted by Lê Phát Đạt to manage many family lands, including a large plot in the Gia Định area, now in Gò Vấp District, Ho Chi Minh City.

In 1900, after his father's death, he married Anna Trần Thị Thơ, daughter of the district chief of Hóc Môn. In economic endeavors, he worked in the electricity sector. As managing director of the Indochina Water and Electricity Company (Compagnie des Eaux et d'Électricité de l'Indochine), he established the Phan Thiết Thermal Power Plant, the Trà Vinh Diesel Power Plant, and lighting systems throughout Cambodia. He also served successively as director of the Société française des distilleries de l’Indochine. He was an honorary member of the Vietnam Banking Association and a member of the Saigon Chamber of Commerce.

Lê Phát An was also involved with the community. He led in implementing new policies and had close relations with the Catholic Church. Throughout his life, he funded many church projects: Tân Hưng - Chợ Cầu Church (1907); the purchase of land from King Thành Thái in Vũng Tàu, which was donated to the Saigon Diocese for the Saint Anna Pedagogical School for the Lovers of the Holy Cross Sisters, and later became the Saint Joseph Minor Seminary Vũng Tàu branch (1920); Hạnh Thông Tây Church (1921); Kim Đôi Lovers of the Holy Cross Convent, the predecessor of the Congregation of Our Lady of the Visitation in Huế; Saint Denis School of the Institut des Frères du Sacré-Coeur, predecessor of the Sacred Heart Congregation in Huế (1925); Thủ Đức Charitable House (now Thủ Đức Youth Village) (1933); Kontum Missionary Seminary (1935). He also invested in printing machinery for the Tân Định printing house.

For these contributions, he was awarded the title of Knight of the Pontifical Order of Saint Sylvester by the Holy See on 25 September, 1927, and Baron Lạc Sơn by the Huế Court on 5 September, 1943. He was also decorated as an Officer of the Légion d'honneur. In addition to the villa at 37-39 Taberd (now Nguyễn Du Street) provided as a contact address, he also had the Mont-Moye (Lạc Sơn) villa in Thủ Đức. Lê Phát An most often stayed at the Mont-Moye villa, as the 37-39 villa was obtained for Pierre Nguyễn Hữu Hào and his wife, parents of Empress Nam Phương.

== Later life and death ==
After his wife's death, he built a new Mont-Joye villa in Hạnh Thông Tây, Gò Vấp. Currently, the villa in Gò Vấp remains intact and is used as the People's Committee of Gò Vấp District.

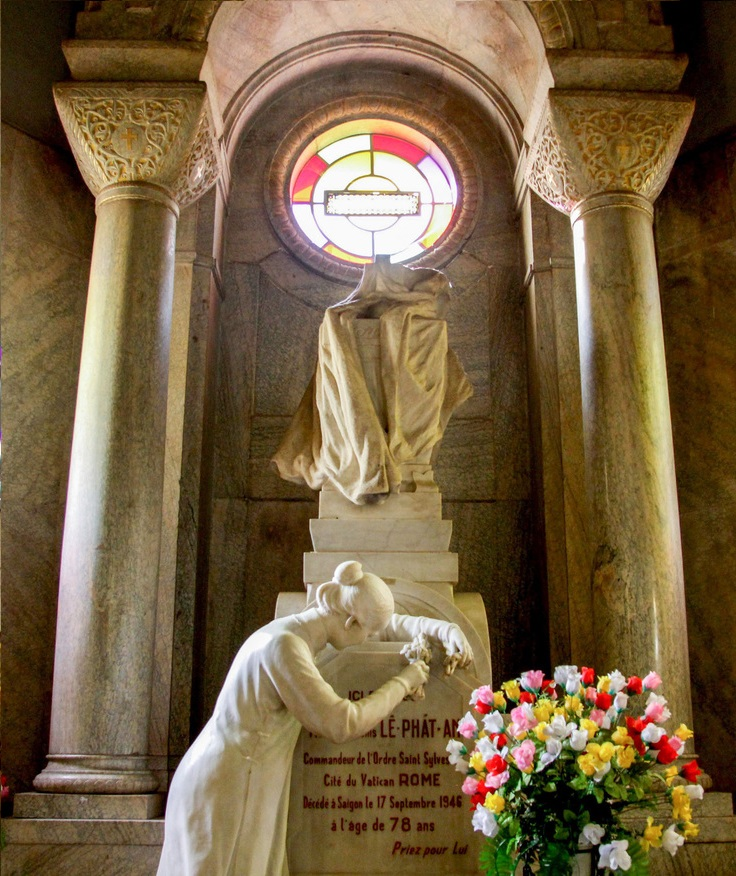
Tomb of Denis Lê Phát An in Hạnh Thông Tây Church

He died on 17 September 1946, at Saint Paul Hospital in Saigon, aged 77. His funeral was held at the Notre-Dame Cathedral Basilica of Saigon. He was buried inside Hạnh Thông Tây Church.

The tomb of Lê Phát An and his wife, Trần Thị Thơ, is near the sanctuary of Hạnh Thông Tây Church. Both of their tombstones record the place and year of their deaths (Thơ died in Thủ Đức on 18 January 1932, aged 60). This forms the shape of a cross: the two protruding tombs act as the crossbar, while the sanctuary is the "head" of the cross, and the rows of pews for parishioners extending to the main church door form the bottom portion. In front of Thơ's tomb is a statue of An kneeling in prayer, and in front of An's tomb is a statue of his wife embracing the tombstone. The two statues are carved from white marble, while the tombs are made of granite. The statue of Lê Phát An wears a turban, áo dài, and is kneeling on a cushion. In front of the kneeling cushion is a bouquet of flowers dedicated to his wife. The statue shows him with thick eyebrows and a mustache. On his chest, his two hands are clasped, raised with a devout expression as if in prayer. The two statues and tombs were made by two French architects and sculptors, A. Contenay and Paul Ducuing.
