= Da Nang Hi-Tech Park =

Danang Hi-Tech Park Khu công nghệ cao Đà Nẵng
Land use planning of Danang Hi-Tech Park
Year of establishment	2010
Area	1,129.76 ha
Address	Hoa Lien, Hoa Vang
City	Da Nang
Nation	Vietnam

Da Nang Hi-tech Park (DHTP) (Vietnamese: Khu công nghệ cao Đà Nẵng) was established under the Decision No. 1979/QD-TTg dated on October 28, 2010, of the Vietnamese Prime Minister.

After the other two Hi-Tech Parks in Hanoi and Ho Chi Minh City, Danang Hi-Tech Park is the third one of the whole country. In the future, Danang Hi-Tech Park will be a destination for both domestic and foreign investors, boosting the science and technology development of Danang City in particular and Central Vietnam and Western Highlands in general.

== Location ==
Danang Hi-Tech Park is planned in Hoa Lien and Hoa Ninh Commune, Hoa Vang District, Da Nang City, on the Danang – Quang Ngai expressway which connects all parts of the key economic zones in Central Vietnam: Chan May Economic zone (Thua Thien Hue Province), Chu Lai – Ky Ha Economic zone (Quang Nam Province), Dung Quat Economic zone (Quang Ngai Province). It is 22 kilometers from the downtown of Danang, 25 kilometers from Tien Sa Seaport and 17 kilometers from Da Nang International Airport.

The total planned area for Danang Hi-Tech Park is 1,129.76 hectares. The construction site has high ground, geological foundation of metamorphic and crystalline igneous system (crystalline schist), convenient for infrastructure construction, no cost for anti-subsidence.

== Danang Hi-Tech Park Management Board ==
Danang Hi-Tech Park Management Board was established by the Decision No. 1980/QD-TTg dated October 28, 2010, of the Vietnamese Prime Minister that has responsibilities in state management with DHTP
