= Tam Nông =

Tam Nông may refer to:

- Tam Nông, Đồng Tháp, a commune in Đồng Tháp province
- Tam Nông, Phú Thọ, a commune in Phú Thọ province
- Tam Nông district, Đồng Tháp, a former district in Đồng Tháp province
- Tam Nông district, Phú Thọ, a former district in Phú Thọ province
