= District 9, Ho Chi Minh City =

Old urban district in Ho Chi Minh City, Vietnam

District 9 Quận 9
- Urban district
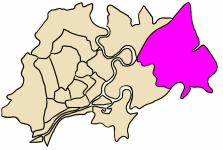
- Position in HCMC's core

- Location in Vietnam
- Coordinates: 10°49′49″N 106°49′3″E
- Country: Vietnam
- Centrally governed city: Ho Chi Minh City
- Wards: 13 phường

Area
  - Total: 114 km^{2} (44 sq mi)

Population
  - Total: 263,486
  - Density: 2,310/km^{2} (5,990/sq mi)

Demographics
  - Main ethnic groups: predominantly Kinh
- Time zone: UTC+07 (ICT)
- Website: quan9.hochiminhcity.gov.vn

District 9 (Vietnamese: Quận 9) is a former urban district (quận) of Ho Chi Minh City, the largest city in Vietnam. As of 2010, the district had a population of 263,486, and an area of 114 km^{2}.

District 9 was merged with District 2 and Thủ Đức district to become Thu Duc City on December 9, 2020, by Standing Committee of the National Assembly's approval.

== Geographical location ==
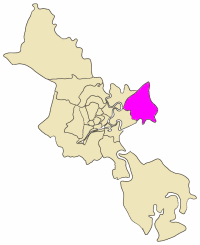
District 9 borders Đồng Nai province to the east, Bình Dương province to the west, District 2 to the south, and Thủ Đức district to the west.

== Administration ==
District 9 consists of 13 wards (phường):

- Phước Long A
- Phước Long B
- Tăng Nhơn Phú A
- Tăng Nhơn Phú B
- Long Trường
- Trường Thạnh
- Phước Bình
- Tân Phú
- Hiệp Phú
- Long Thạnh Mỹ
- Long Bình
- Long Phước
- Phú Hữu

== Education ==
Lycée Français International Marguerite Duras, the French international school, is in Long Bình.
