= Tam Nông, Phú Thọ =

Tam Nông
- Commune
- Country: Vietnam
- Province: Phú Thọ
- Establish: June 16, 2025

Area
  - Total: 28.25 km^{2} (10.91 sq mi)

Population (2025)
  - Total: 26,412 people
  - Density: 934.9/km^{2} (2,421/sq mi)
- Time zone: UTC+07:00

Tam Nông is a commune in Phú Thọ province, Vietnam. It is one of 148 communes and wards in the province following the 2025 reorganization.

== Geography ==
Tam Nông commune has the following geographical location:

- To the north, it borders Bản Nguyên commune and Phùng Nguyên commune.
- To the east, it borders Hanoi capital.
- To the south, it borders Đào Xá commune.
- To the west, it borders Vạn Xuân and Thọ Văn communes.
