= Thủ Đức (city) =

Thủ Đức Thành phố Thủ Đức Eastern City, East Saigon
- Municipal city (Class-1)
- Thủ Đức City
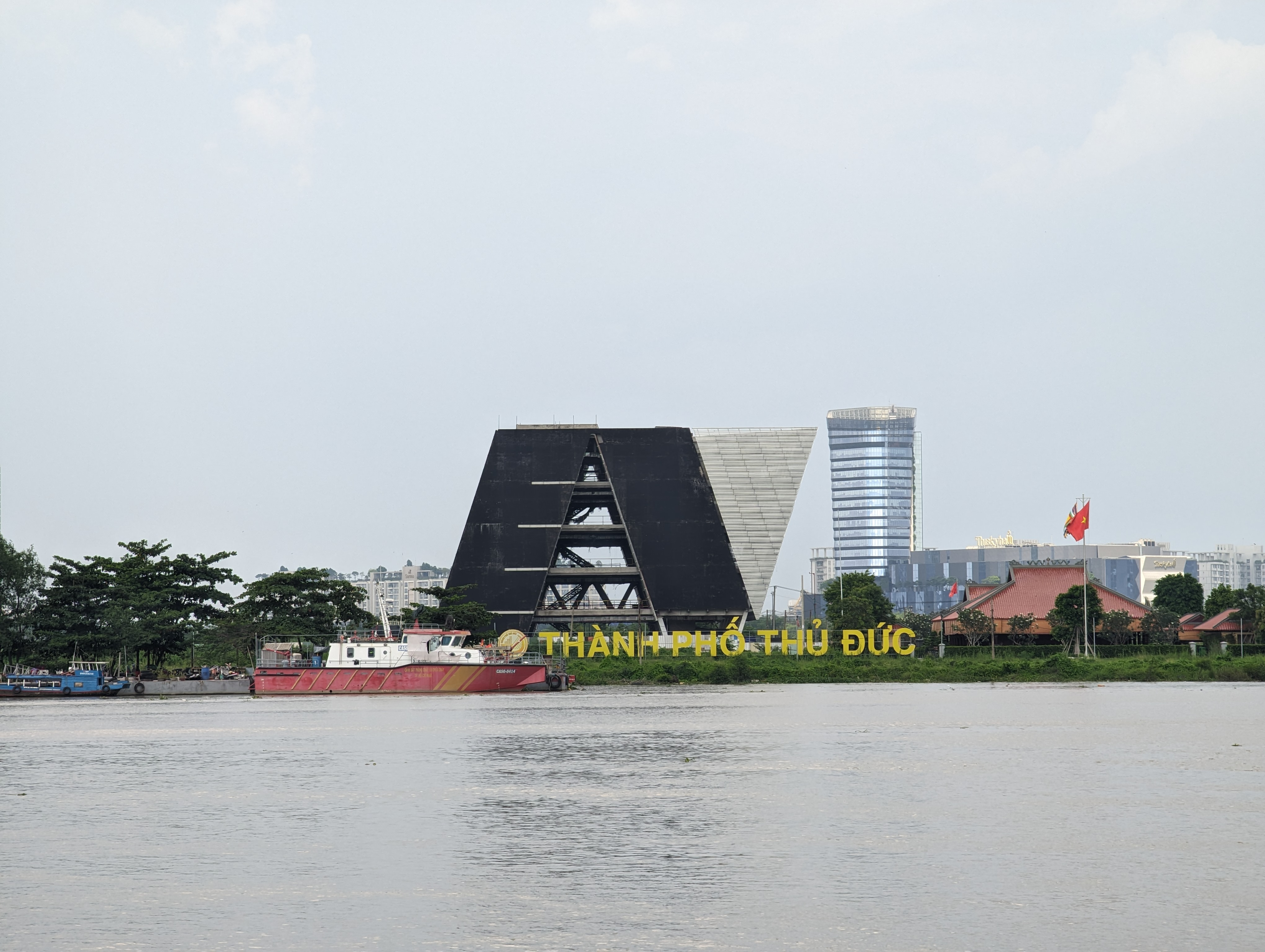
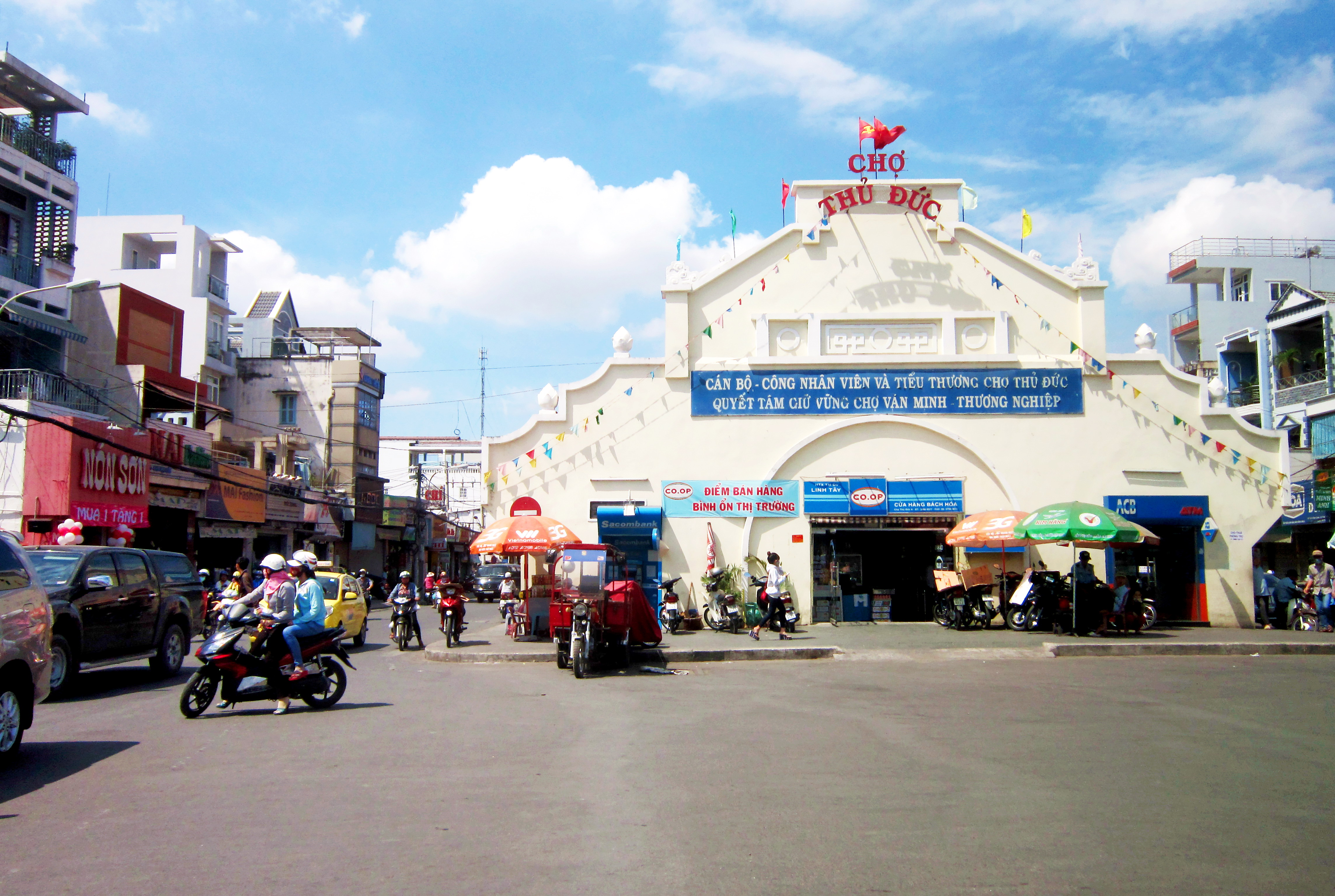
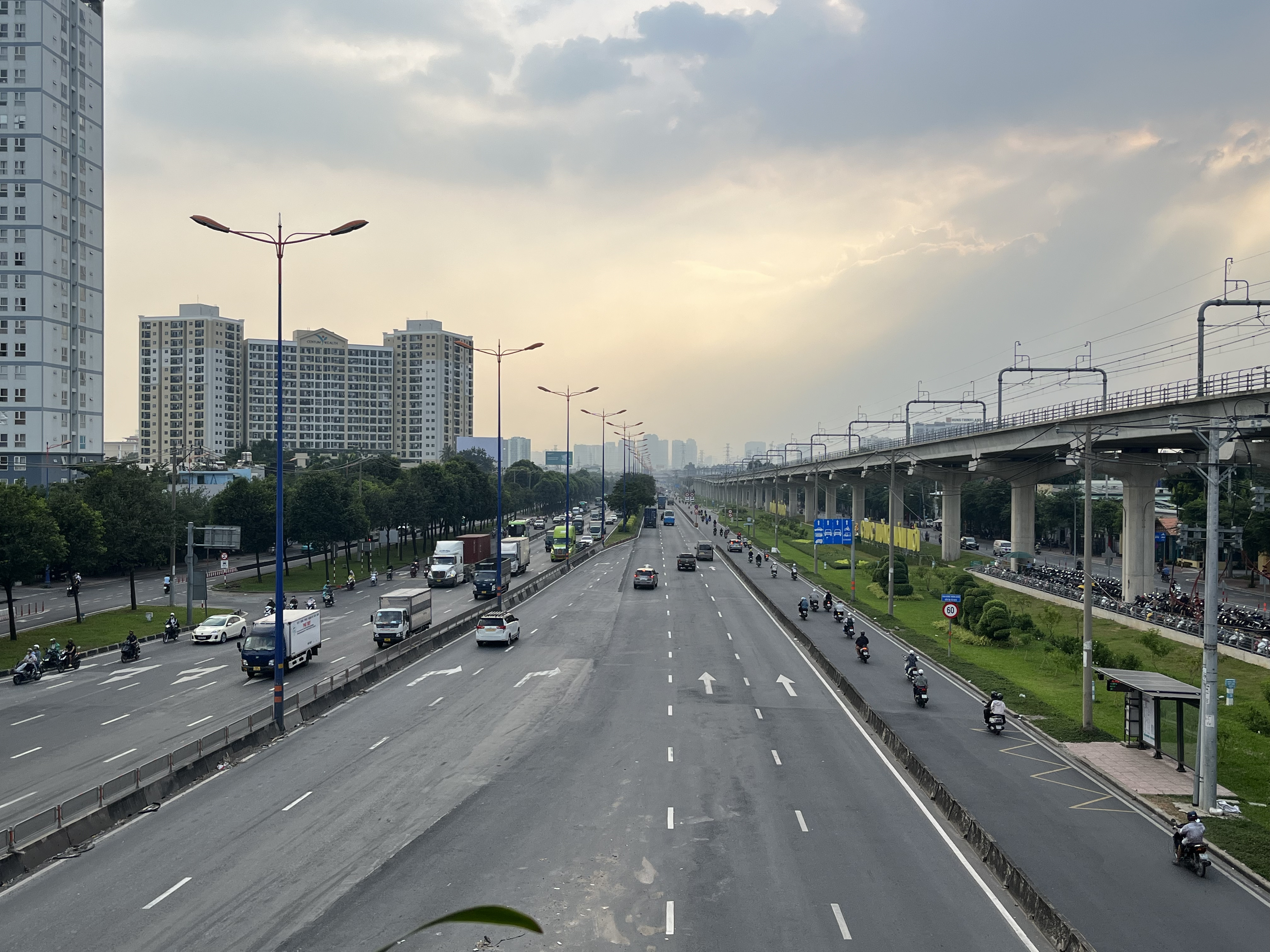
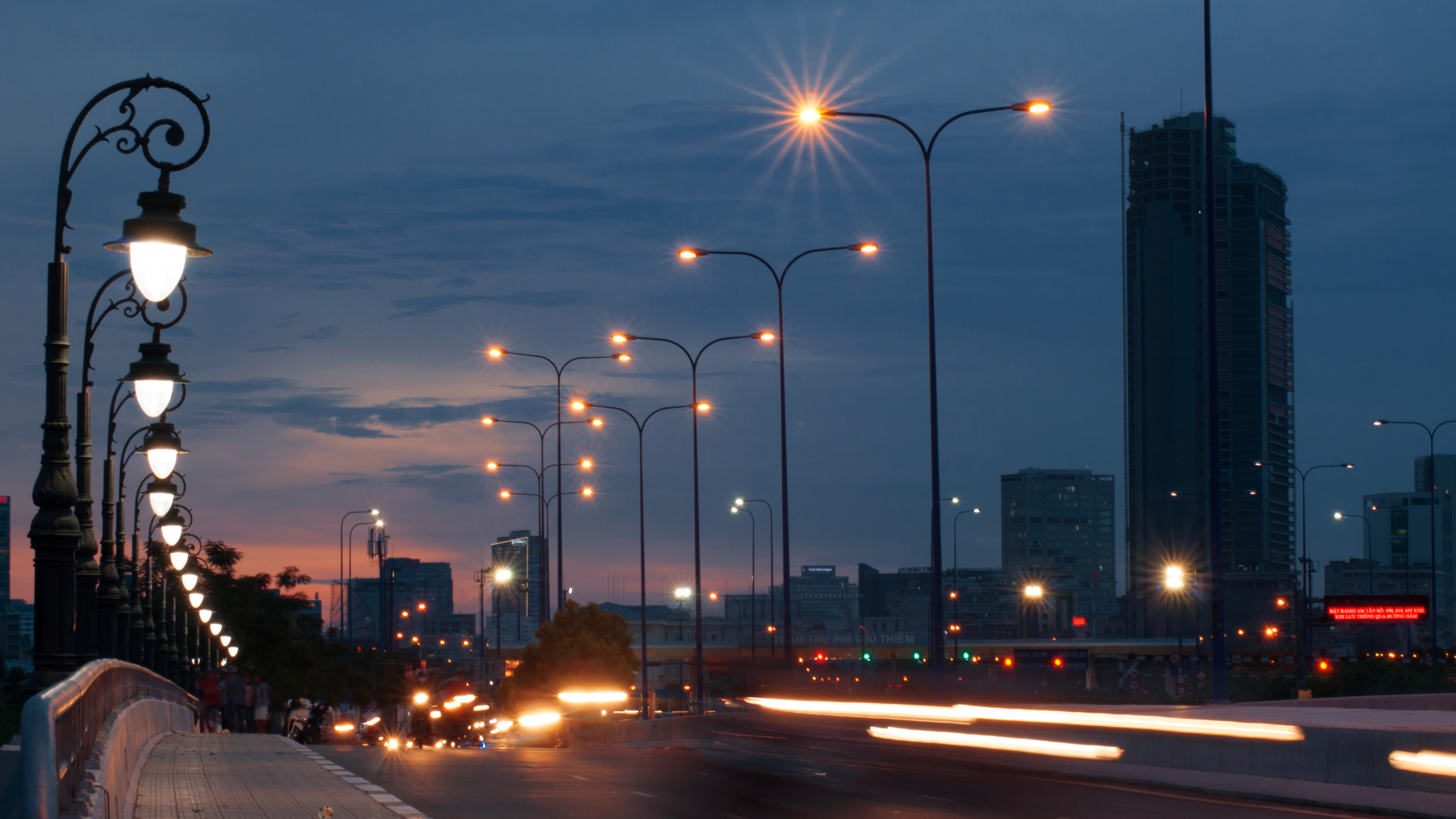
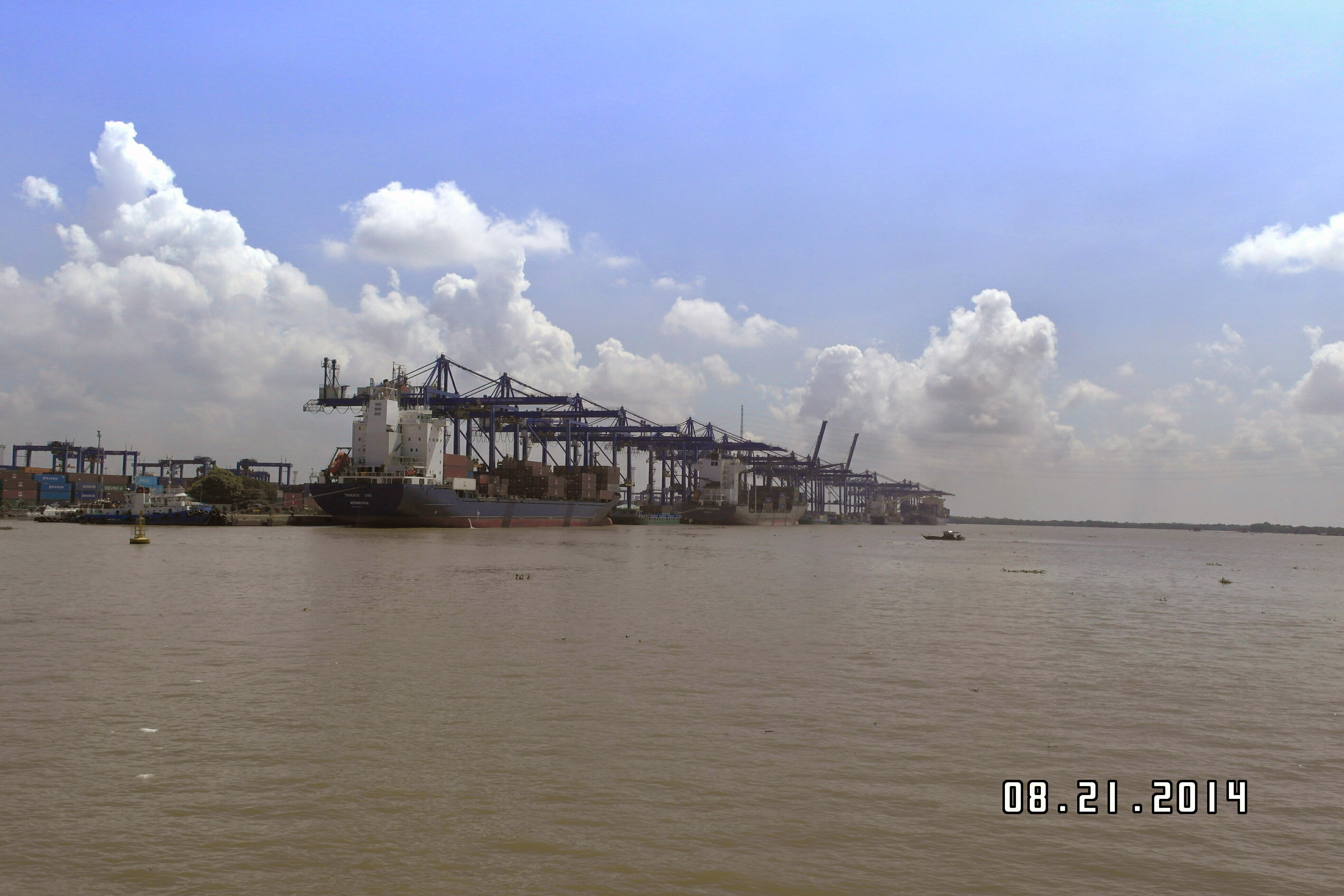
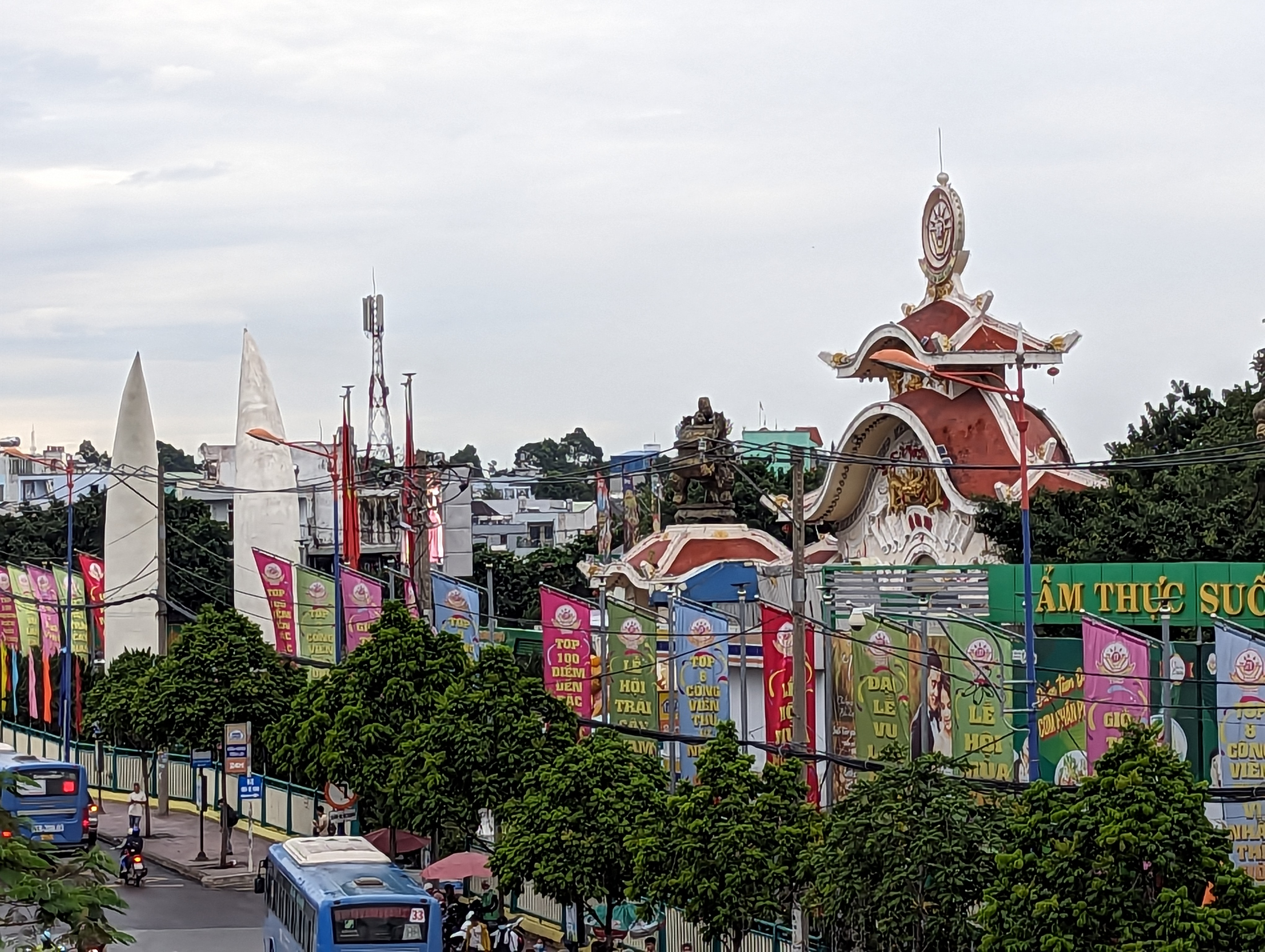
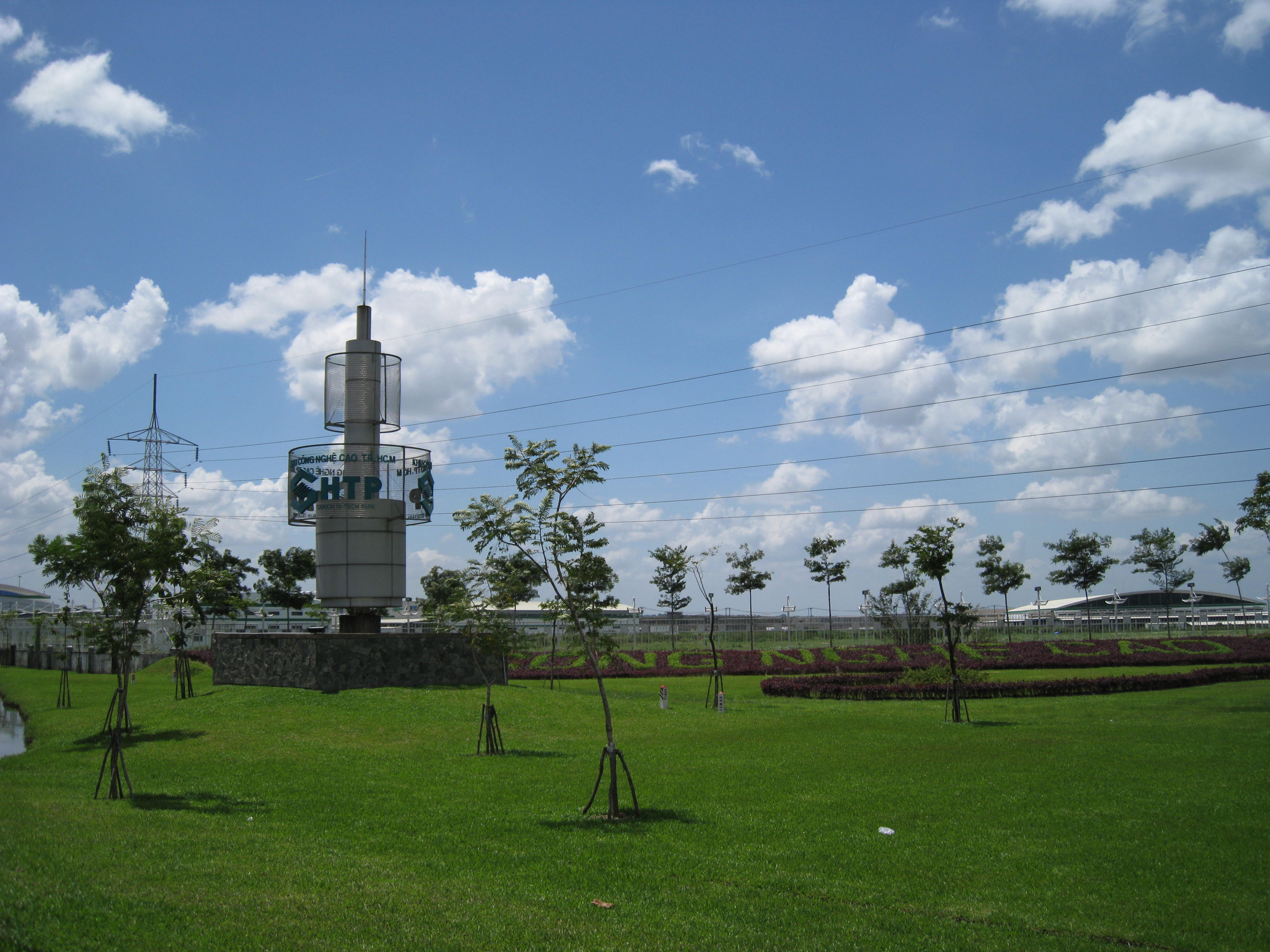
- Ho Chi Minh City Planning Exhibition Center with An Khánh Temple and Thisofic Tower (both right) in Thủ Thiêm new urban area Thủ Đức Market at the historic downtown of the city Hanoi Highway along with Ho Chi Minh City Metro Line 1 East – West Highway towards to Thủ Thiêm Tunnel Cát Lái Port on Đồng Nai River Suối Tiên Amusement Park Saigon Hi-Tech Park

- Seal
- Nicknames: "The Golden Gate of Saigon" "The Capital of Vietnamese Hi-Tech"
- Location within Ho Chi Minh City

- Location within Vietnam
- Coordinates: 10°49′35.62″N 106°45′39.23″E
- Country: Vietnam
- Municipality: Ho Chi Minh City
- Establishment: 1868 : Thủ Đức District, Biên Hòa; 1955 : Thủ Đức District, Gia Định; 1975 : Thủ Đức District, Saigon - Gia Định; 1997 : Established District 2, District 9, Thủ Đức District; 2021 : Thủ Đức City
- Central hall: 168 Trương Văn Bang Street, Thạnh Mỹ Lợi
- Wards: 34

Government
  - Type: Urban Governance
  - Body: City of Thủ Đức People's Council
  - Secretary of CPV: Nguyễn Văn Hiếu
  - Chairman of People's Council: Nguyễn Phước Hưng
  - Chairman of People's Committee: Hoàng Tùng

Area
  - Total: 211.56 km^{2} (81.68 sq mi)

Population (2019)
  - Total: 1,013,795
  - Density: 4,792.0/km^{2} (12,411/sq mi)
- Time zone: UTC+7 (Indochina Time)
- Website: Tpthuduc.Hochiminhcity.gov.vn

Thủ Đức (IPA: [tʰu˨˩˦:ɗɨk˧˥]) is a former sub-municipality in Ho Chi Minh City of the Southeast region of Vietnam.

Thủ Đức ceased to exist as a municipal city on 1 July 2025, following the elimination of district level units in Vietnam.

== History ==
The oldest name what was recorded in this area was Ngãi An (義安), a district-level administrative unit has existed since the Nguyễn lords. However, since October 9, 1868, the French government in Cochinchina has decided to change its name to Thủ Đức or sometimes Thũ Đức (Note: The record of local voice in Saigon. This rule was circulated regularly before 2000.) (守德) to suit the expansion and upgrade plan for the land. That was inherently a pen name of a Minh Hương man called Tạ Huy (謝輝), courtesy name Dương Minh (揚明), who has made meritorious services to this area. He was ordained "pioneering saint" (前賢, tiền hiền) by Saigonese folk. (Note: Nguyễn Liên Phong, Nam Kỳ phong tục nhơn vật diễn ca (Customs and figures in Cochinchina by poetry), Phát Toán publishing house, Saigon, Cochinchina, 1909.)

Thủ Đức city was founded by the Standing Committee of the National Assembly on December 9, 2020, from the districts of 2, 9, and Thủ Đức District. Thu Duc City covers 211.56 km^{2}, the population as of 2019 was 1,013,795 inhabitants. The establishment of Thu Duc City is hoped to enable it to contribute more to national economic growth and boost development in the Southern Key Economic Zone (SKEZ).

This new city-within-city model has been used by many places in the world including financial center Canary Wharf in London, Silicon Valley in the United States, Gangnam in Seoul or Pudong in Shanghai, etc. It was suggested that Thu Đức should be given autonomy in decision making and policy incentives to develop innovation capacity to improve competitiveness like what China did to Shenzhen, whose economy now is larger than Hong Kong's.

== Geography ==
Thủ Đức lies in the eastern of Ho Chi Minh City, adjacent to:

- Biên Hòa and Long Thành district of Đồng Nai province to the east by Đồng Nai River
- District 1, 4, 12 and Bình Thạnh to the west by Saigon River
- Nhơn Trạch district of Đồng Nai province (by Đồng Nai River) and District 7, Ho Chi Minh City (by Saigon River)
- Dĩ An and Thuận An, Bình Dương to the north

The city has an area of 211,56 km^{2}, population as of 2019 is 1,013,795 people, population density is 4,792 people/km^{2}.

== Administration ==
Thủ Đức was a class-1 city of Ho Chi Minh City and the first city to use city-within-city model in Vietnam.

Thủ Đức City has 34 wards, which is now reformed into 12 wards directly managed by Ho Chi Minh City:

- An Khánh: An Khánh, An Lợi Đông, Thủ Thiêm, Thảo Điền with part in northern Hanoi Highway of An Phú
- Bình Trưng: An Phú, Bình Trưng Đông, Bình Trưng Tây
- Cát Lái: Cát Lái, Thạnh Mỹ Lợi
- Phước Long: Phước Long A, Phước Long B, Phước Bình
- Long Phước: Long Phước, Trường Thạnh
- Long Trường: Long Trường, Phú Hữu
- Long Bình: Long Bình, Long Thạnh Mỹ
- Linh Xuân: Linh Xuân, Linh Trung, Linh Tây
- Hiệp Bình: Hiệp Bình Chánh, Hiệp Bình Phước, Linh Đông
- Tam Bình: Bình Chiểu, Tam Bình, Tam Phú
- Tăng Nhơn Phú: Tăng Nhơn Phú A, Tăng Nhơn Phú B, Tân Phú, Hiệp Phú
- Thủ Đức: Linh Chiểu, Bình Thọ, Trường Thọ, part of Linh Tây (Thủ Đức Market)

After arrangement, Ho Chi Minh City consists of 22 district-level subdivisions including 1 city, 16 urban districts, and 5 rural districts. The further commune-level subdivisions would have 312 in total including 249 wards, 58 communes, 5 commune-level towns.

== Culture ==
=== Education ===
During the existence of the Republic of Vietnam regime, it was the location of Thu Duc Military Academy.

- Vietnam National University, Ho Chi Minh City
- Thủ Thiêm new urban area
- Saigon Hi-Tech Park
- Cát Lái - Phú Hữu Port
- Suối Tiên Amusement Park

=== Consulate ===
List of consulate general in the City of Thủ Đức
Nation	Address
Austria	12/140 Nguyễn Văn Hưởng, Thảo Điền
Malaysia	109 Nguyễn Văn Hưởng, Thảo Điền
Philippines	998 Đồng Văn Cống, Thạnh Mỹ Lợi
Sweden	146-E15 Nguyễn Văn Hưởng, Thảo Điền

== Economy ==
Thu Duc City will contribute one third of Ho Chi Minh City's gross regional domestic product (GRDP) and account for 7 percent of the national gross domestic product (GDP), which is only behind Hanoi's GRDP in scale but higher than that of Binh Duong and Dong Nai.

=== Innovation projects ===
There are eight innovation centers in total of Thu Duc city:

- Thủ Thiêm Fintech Hub (part of VIFC-HCM)
- Trường Thọ Port Urban Area (Saigon Quays)
- Rach Chiec National Sports Complex
- National University IT and EduTech Hub
- Saigon Hi-Tech Park and Automated Manufacturing Hub
- Tam Đa Ecotech Hub
- Creative Startup Center
- Traffic Hub connecting the Southeastern parts and Cát Lái International Port

=== Highway and expressway ===
- Hà Nội Highway
- Ho Chi Minh City–Long Thanh–Dau Giay Expressway
- Ho Chi Minh City–Chon Thanh–Hoa Lu Expressway (planned)
- National Route 1
- Ring Road 2
- Ring Road 3

=== Services ===
- New Eastern Bus Station
- Sông Tắc Bus Station (Eastern 2 Bus Station, proposed)
- Ho Chi Minh City Metro (Line 1, Line 2, Line 3, Line 5, Line 6, Line 7, Line 10)
- Thủ Thiêm–Long Thành Light Rail (planned)
- North–South Railway (Bình Triệu station)
- North–South Express Railway (planned)
