= Thủ Đức, Ho Chi Minh City =

Thủ Đức Phường Thủ Đức Linh Chiểu, Linh Đông, Trường Thọ, Bình Thọ
- Ward
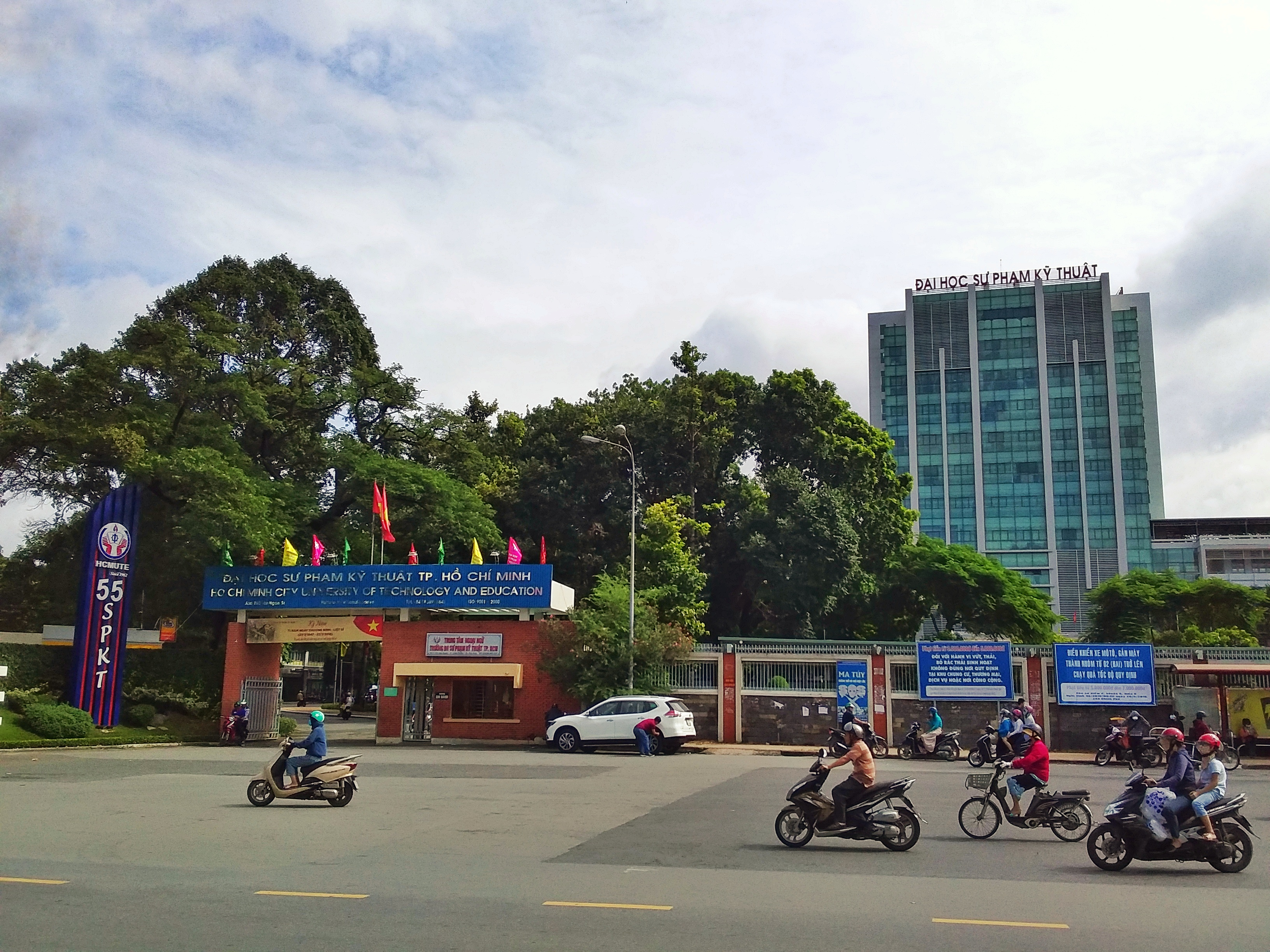
- Ho Chi Minh City University of Technology and Engineering
- Interactive map of Thủ Đức
- Coordinates: 10°49′59″N 106°45′21″E
- Country: Vietnam
- Municipality: Ho Chi Minh City
- Established: June 16, 2025

Area
  - Total: 3.40 sq mi (8.81 km^{2})

Population (2024)
  - Total: 118,952
  - Density: 35,000/sq mi (13,500/km^{2})
- Time zone: UTC+07:00 (Indochina Time)
- Administrative code: 26824

Thủ Đức (Vietnamese: Phường Thủ Đức) is a ward of Ho Chi Minh City, Vietnam. It is one of the 168 new wards, communes and special zones of the city following the reorganization in 2025.

== History ==
On June 16, 2025, the National Assembly Standing Committee issued Resolution No. 1685/NQ-UBTVQH15 on the arrangement of commune-level administrative units of Ho Chi Minh City in 2025 (effective from June 16, 2025). Accordingly, the entire land area and population of Linh Chiểu, Bình Thọ, Trường Thọ wards and part of Linh Đông, Linh Tây wards of the former Thủ Đức city will be integrated into a new ward named Thủ Đức (Clause 68, Article 1).

== Geography ==
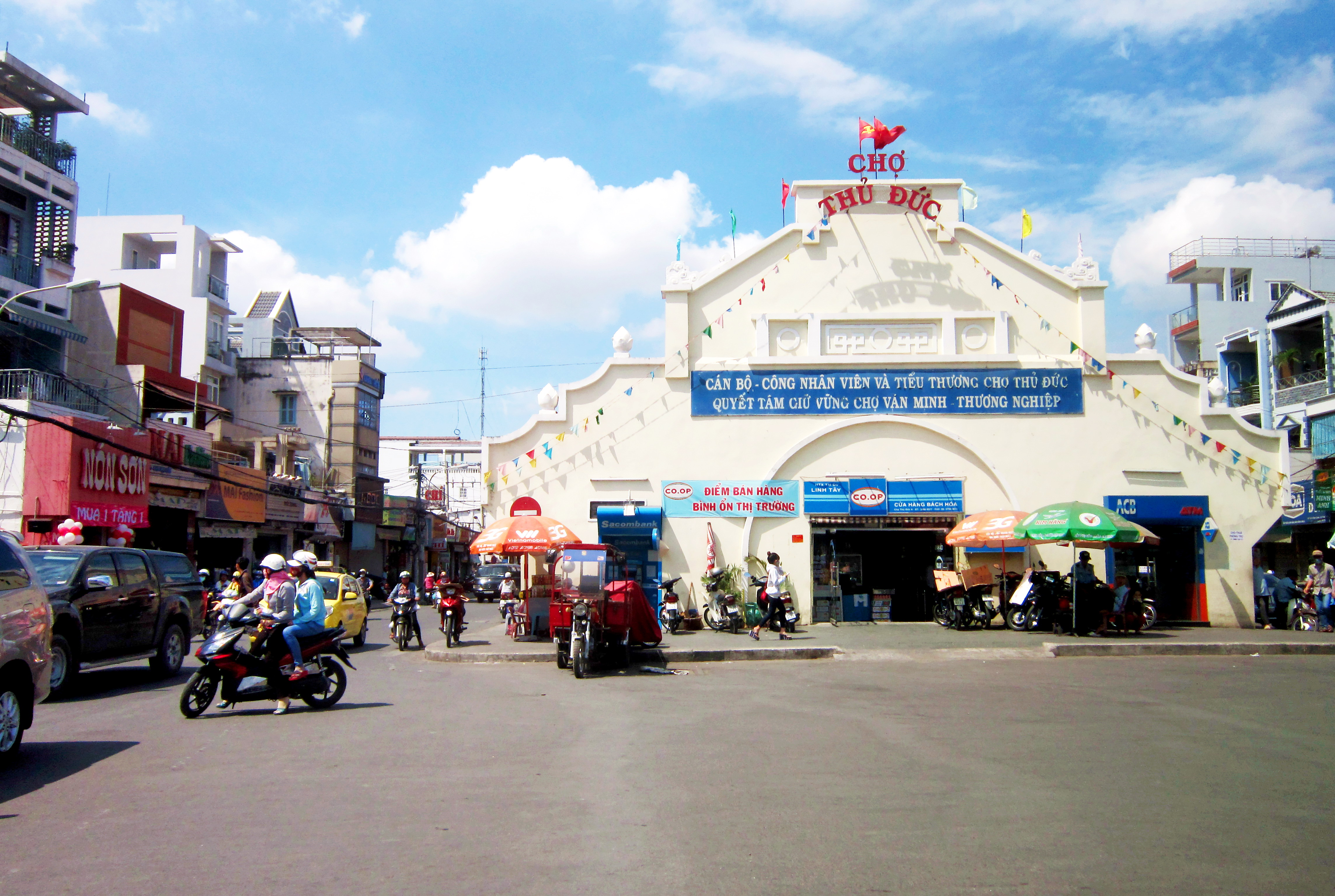
Thủ Đức Market

Ward of Thủ Đức is about 12 km away to the northeast of Saigon, located at the central of former city of Thủ Đức. It is bordered by:

- Linh Xuân to the north by Thủ Đức creek, Kha Vạn Cân (including Thủ Đức Market), Hoàng Diệu 2 and Lê Văn Chí roads
- An Khánh to the south by Rạch Chiếc – Trau Trảu creek
- Hiệp Bình to the west by Gò Dưa creek and Phạm Văn Đồng Boulevard
- Bình Quới to the southwest by Saigon River
- Phước Long and Tăng Nhơn Phú to the east by Hanoi Highway.

According to Official Dispatch No. 2896/BNV-CQĐP dated May 27, 2025 of the Ministry of Home Affairs, following the merger, Thủ Đức has a land area of 8.81 km², the population as of December 31, 2024 is 118,952 people, the population density is 13,501 people/km².

== Education ==
=== Higher educations ===
- Ho Chi Minh City University of Technology and Engineering
- Ho Chi Minh City University of Banking – Thủ Đức Campus
- Ho Chi Minh City University of Architecture
- Ho Chi Minh City College of Technology
- Ho Chi Minh City College of Construction
- Ho Chi Minh City Vocational College – Campus 2
- People's Police College II
- Thủ Đức College of Technology
- Thủ Đức College of Technical and Economic College
- Đại Việt Saigon College

=== Schools ===
==== High Schools ====
- Thủ Đức High School
- Nguyễn Hữu Thọ High School
- An Dương Vương High School
- Hoa Sen Secondary and High School

==== Secondary Schools ====
- Bình Thọ Secondary School
- Trường Thọ Secondary School
- Lê Quý Đôn Secondary School
- Lê Văn Việt Secondary School
- Trương Văn Ngư Secondary School

==== Primary Schools ====
- Linh Chiểu Primary School
- Từ Đức Primary School
- Nguyễn Văn Banh Primary School
- Nguyễn Trung Trực School
- Lương Thế Vinh Primary School
