= Đào Xá =

- Commune
- Interactive map of Đào Xá
- Coordinates: 21°13′09″N 105°16′12″E
- Country: Vietnam
- Region: Northeast
- Province: Phú Thọ
- Established: 16 June 2025
- Administrative headquarters: Area 5 (former Đào Xá commune)

Area
  - Total: 45.53 km^{2} (17.58 sq mi)

Population (2025)
  - Total: 32,156
  - Density: 706/km^{2} (1,830/sq mi)
- Postal code: 35860
- Website: daoxa.phutho.gov.vn

Đào Xá is a commune in Phú Thọ province, Vietnam.

Đào Xá was formerly a commune of the former Thanh Thủy district.

On 16 June 2025, the National Assembly of Vietnam adopted Resolution No. 203/2025/QH15 amending and supplementing several articles of the Constitution of Vietnam, which provided for the termination of district-level administrative units nationwide from 1 July 2025.

On the same date, the Standing Committee of the National Assembly of Vietnam issued Resolution No. 1676/NQ-UBTVQH15 on the arrangement of commune-level administrative units in Phú Thọ province in 2025. Under the resolution, the entire area and population of Xuân Lộc, Thạch Đồng, Tân Phương, and Đào Xá communes, formerly part of Thanh Thủy district, were merged to form a new commune named Đào Xá.
