= Tech hub =

Area containing a large number of high tech companies

A tech hub is an area that houses a significant concentration of high tech companies and related institutions. Entire cities may be considered tech hubs for their respective countries or broader regions, while certain tech hubs may be suburbs within cities.

Tech hubs often contain both large, established tech companies, as well as startups, and startup incubators and accelerators. They may also be home to universities and other educational institutions that cater towards computer science and other tech-related degrees.

Tech hubs are distinct from technology parks (alternatively called research parks). While a tech hub is an area (such as a city) with a concentration of high tech businesses, a technology park is a property development established for the purpose of housing and fostering collaboration between tenant firms, and is often affiliated with a university, government, or private research institution.

== Characteristics ==
Tech hubs are not merely collections of high tech organizations, but rather, by extension, communities that form around mutual goals, knowledge sharing, and innovation. Tech hubs often include startup incubators and accelerators, venture capital firms, and research institutions. Tech hub communities commonly facilitate professional networking and collaboration.

As such, tech hubs often serve as ecosystems to bring students, professionals, and tech enthusiasts together around common interests. Numerous tech hubs around the world have become associated with innovation, entrepreneurship, and technological advancement on a global scale.

== Examples ==
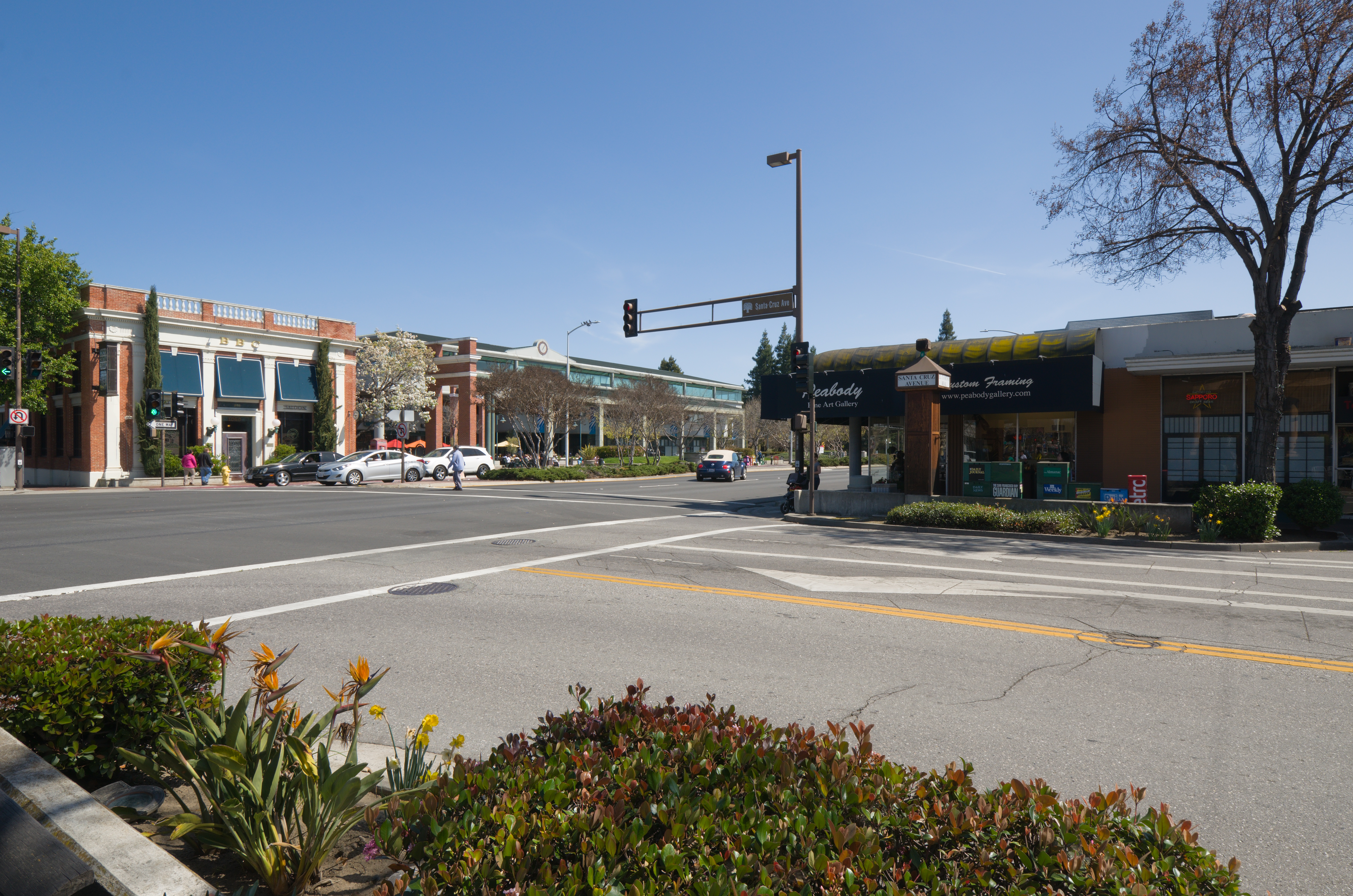
Menlo Park, United States

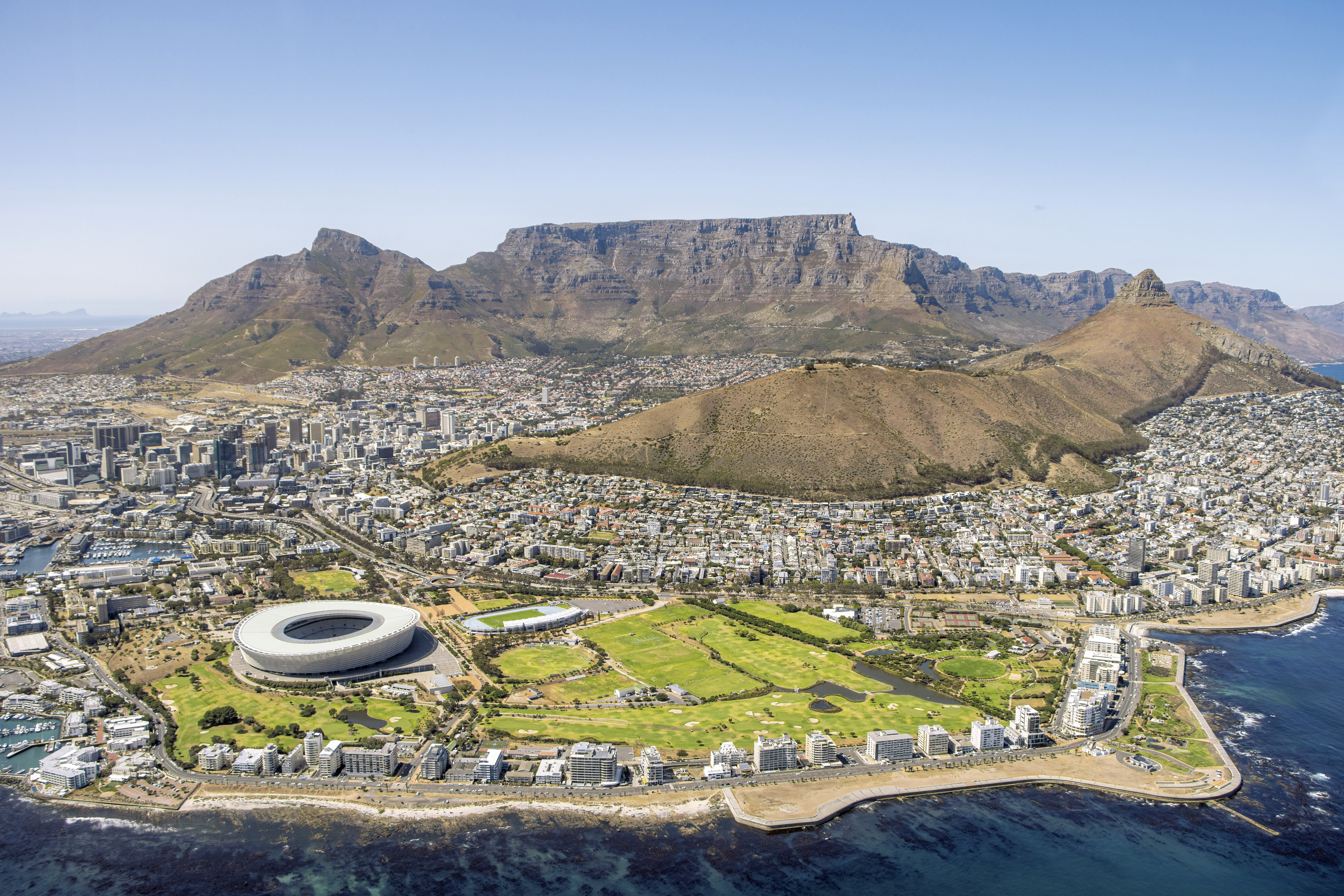
Cape Town, South Africa

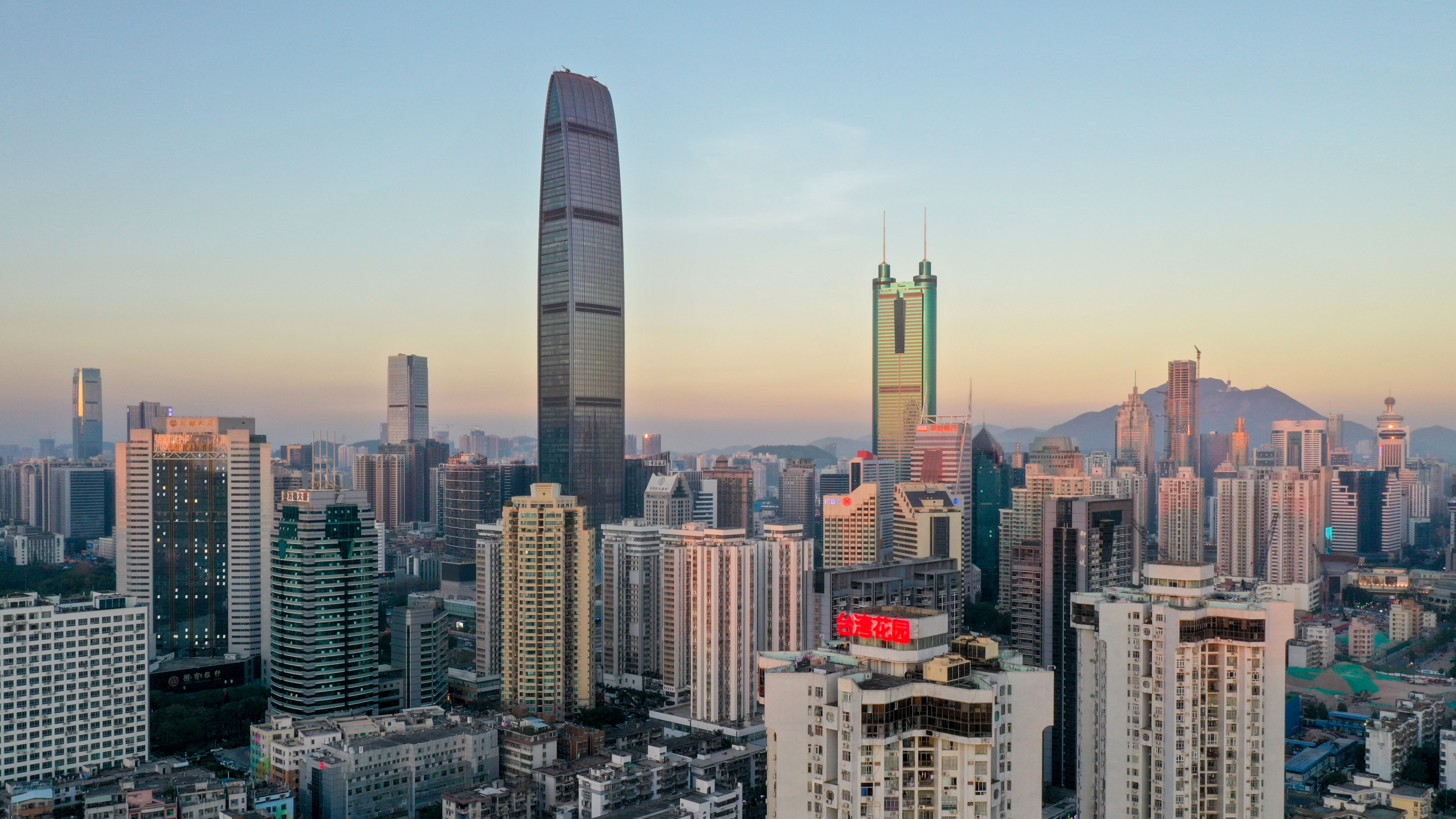
Shenzhen, China

- Silicon Valley in the United States is deemed the world's largest tech hub, and is home to some of the largest tech companies globally. These include Google, Facebook, Netflix, AMD, Nvidia, Oracle, and PayPal. Silicon Valley is also home to 30 companies in the Fortune 1000.
- Cape Town, South Africa, is widely considered Africa's tech hub. The city is home to hundreds of startups (including over 60 fintechs), numerous large tech companies, and is popular among digital nomads. The headquarters of Yoco, Admyt, Xneelo, Naspers, Aerobotics, and Liquid are in Cape Town. The city was the birthplace of Amazon Web Services, and houses Amazon's Africa headquarters. The local tech industry is one of the fastest-growing economic sectors.
- Shenzhen, China, is a major tech hub in Asia, and is home to the headquarters of numerous large technology corporations, such as Huawei, Tencent, DJI, and Oppo. Shenzhen is one of China's special economic zones.

== See also ==
- Science park
- List of technology centers
- List of largest technology companies by revenue
- Knowledge economy
