= Phước Long, Ho Chi Minh City =

Phước Long Phường Phước Long Bình Thái, Phước Bình
- Ward
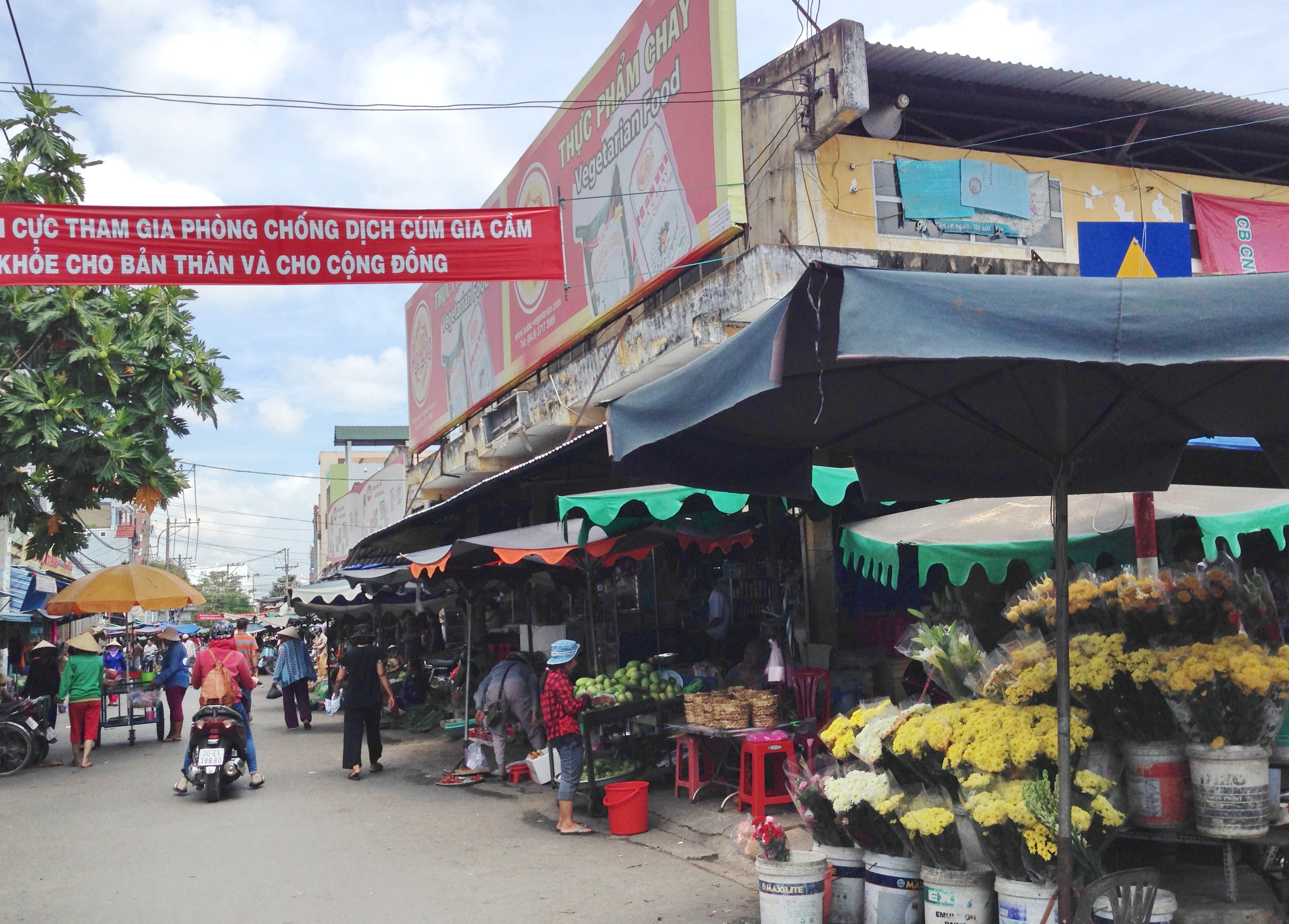
- Phước Bình Market
- Interactive map of Phước Long
- Coordinates: 10°48′57″N 106°46′14″E
- Country: Vietnam
- Municipality: Ho Chi Minh City
- Established: June 16, 2025

Area
  - Total: 3.56 sq mi (9.23 km^{2})

Population (2024)
  - Total: 137,331
  - Density: 38,500/sq mi (14,900/km^{2})
- Time zone: UTC+07:00 (Indochina Time)
- Administrative code: 26848

Phước Long (Vietnamese: Phường Phước Long) is a ward of Ho Chi Minh City, Vietnam. It is one of the 168 new wards, communes and special zones of the city following the reorganization in 2025.

== History ==
On June 16, 2025, the National Assembly Standing Committee issued Resolution No. 1685/NQ-UBTVQH15 on the arrangement of commune-level administrative units of Ho Chi Minh City in 2025 (effective from June 16, 2025). Accordingly, the entire land area and population of Phước Bình, Phước Long A and Phước Long B wards of the former Thủ Đức city will be integrated into a new ward named Phước Long (Clause 77, Article 1).
