= Mobile World Investment Corporation =

Vietnamese publicly listed retailer

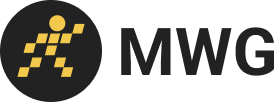
- Native name: Công ty Cổ phần Đầu tư Thế Giới Di Động
- Type: Public
- Traded as: HOSE: MWG
- ISIN: VN000000MWG0
- Industry: Retail
- Founded: March 2004
- Founder: Nguyen Duc Tai
- Headquarters: Ho Chi Minh City, Vietnam
- Key people: Nguyen Duc Tai (chairman); Doan Van Hieu Em (CEO)
- Products: Consumer electronics, mobile phones, home appliances, groceries, pharmaceuticals
- Revenue: ₫134.341 trillion (2024)
- Net income: ₫3.722 trillion (2024)
- Number of employees: 60,000 (2025)
- Website: https://mwg.vn/eng

Mobile World Investment Corporation (Công ty Cổ phần Đầu tư Thế Giới Di Động; MWG) is a Vietnamese publicly listed retailer that operates the nationwide chains thegioididong.com (mobile devices) and Dien May Xanh (..), as well as the grocery chain Bach Hoa Xanh and An Khang pharmacies. The company listed on the Ho Chi Minh City Stock Exchange in July 2014. In 2024, MWG reported consolidated revenue of ₫134.341 trillion and net profit of ₫3.722 trillion.

== History ==
MWG traces its origins to March 2004, when Nguyen Duc Tai and partners opened the first thegioididong.com mobile phone store in Ho Chi Minh City. The company went public in July 2014; its stock hit the upper trading limit on debut.

Following a consumer slowdown, MWG closed or consolidated about 150 underperforming stores in late 2023 as part of a restructuring programme.

=== Bach Hoa Xanh stake sale (2022–2024) ===
International media have given significant coverage to MWG’s efforts to bring in external capital for Bach Hoa Xanh (BHX). In August 2022 Reuters reported that MWG was exploring the sale of up to 20% of BHX. In September 2023 Reuters said Singapore’s GIC was among bidders for a minority stake. In February 2024 Reuters reported that China’s CDH Investments was in advanced talks to acquire a minority stake valuing the chain at up to US$1.7 billion, and in April 2024 state media VietnamPlus reported the completion of a 5% private placement to CDH.

=== Overseas expansion ===
MWG entered Cambodia in 2017 under the BigPhone/Bluetronics brand and later exited amid restructuring. In March 2022 MWG formed a joint venture with Indonesia’s PT Erafone Artha Retailindo (Erajaya Group) to launch the Era Blue consumer electronics chain; trade press later discussed the JV’s structure and strategy, and by January 2024 the venture had opened its 50th store.

== Operations and brands ==
- thegioididong.com — handset and mobile device retail chain.
- Dien May Xanh — consumer electronics and home appliances retail chain.
- Bach Hoa Xanh — grocery and convenience chain; resumed expansion after restructuring and minority investment.
- An Khang — pharmacy chain.
- TopZone — Apple-focused retail format; reported break-even in 2024.
- Era Blue (Indonesia) — consumer electronics retail joint venture with Erafone (Erajaya Group).

== Finance ==
For 2024, MWG reported consolidated revenue of ₫134.341 trillion and net profit of ₫3.722 trillion, according to Reuters’ annual income statement data.
