= Thủ Đức district =

Thủ Đức district Quận Thủ Đức
- Urban district
- Trường Thọ, Thủ Đức

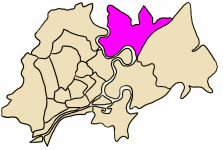
- Position in HCMC's core

- Location of Thủ Đức District
- Coordinates: 10°48′10″N 106°41′41″E
- Country: Vietnam
- Centrally governed city: Ho Chi Minh City
- Seat: 43 Nguyễn Văn Bá
- Wards: 12 phường

Area
  - Total: 47.76 km^{2} (18.44 sq mi)

Population (2018)
  - Total: 524,670
  - Density: 10,990/km^{2} (28,450/sq mi)

Demographics
  - Main ethnic groups: predominantly Kinh
- Time zone: UTC+07 (ICT)
- Website: thuduc.hochiminhcity.gov.vn

Thủ Đức is a former urban district (quận) in the northeast of Ho Chi Minh City, Vietnam. In 1997, the southern part of Thủ Đức was divided to become District 2 and District 9. In 2010, the district had a population of 455,899. It covered an area of 48 km^{2}.

Thủ Đức district was merged with District 2 and District 9 again to become Thủ Đức City in January 2021, by Standing Committee of the National Assembly's approval.

== Location within Ho Chi Minh City ==
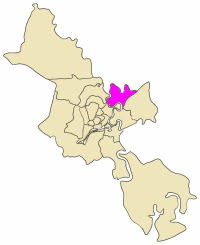

== Administration ==
Thủ Đức district consists of 12 wards: Linh Đông, Linh Tây, Linh Chiểu, Linh Trung, Linh Xuân, Hiệp Bình Chánh, Hiệp Bình Phước, Tam Phú, Trường Thọ, Bình Chiểu, Bình Thọ and Tam Bình.

== Amenities ==
Thủ Đức district hosted the Saigon Water Park which has now closed. It was the location of Thủ Đức Military Academy.

== Education ==
It is the location of Vietnam National University, Ho Chi Minh City.
