= Long Bình, Ho Chi Minh City =

Long Bình Phường Long Bình Long Thạnh Mỹ
- Ward
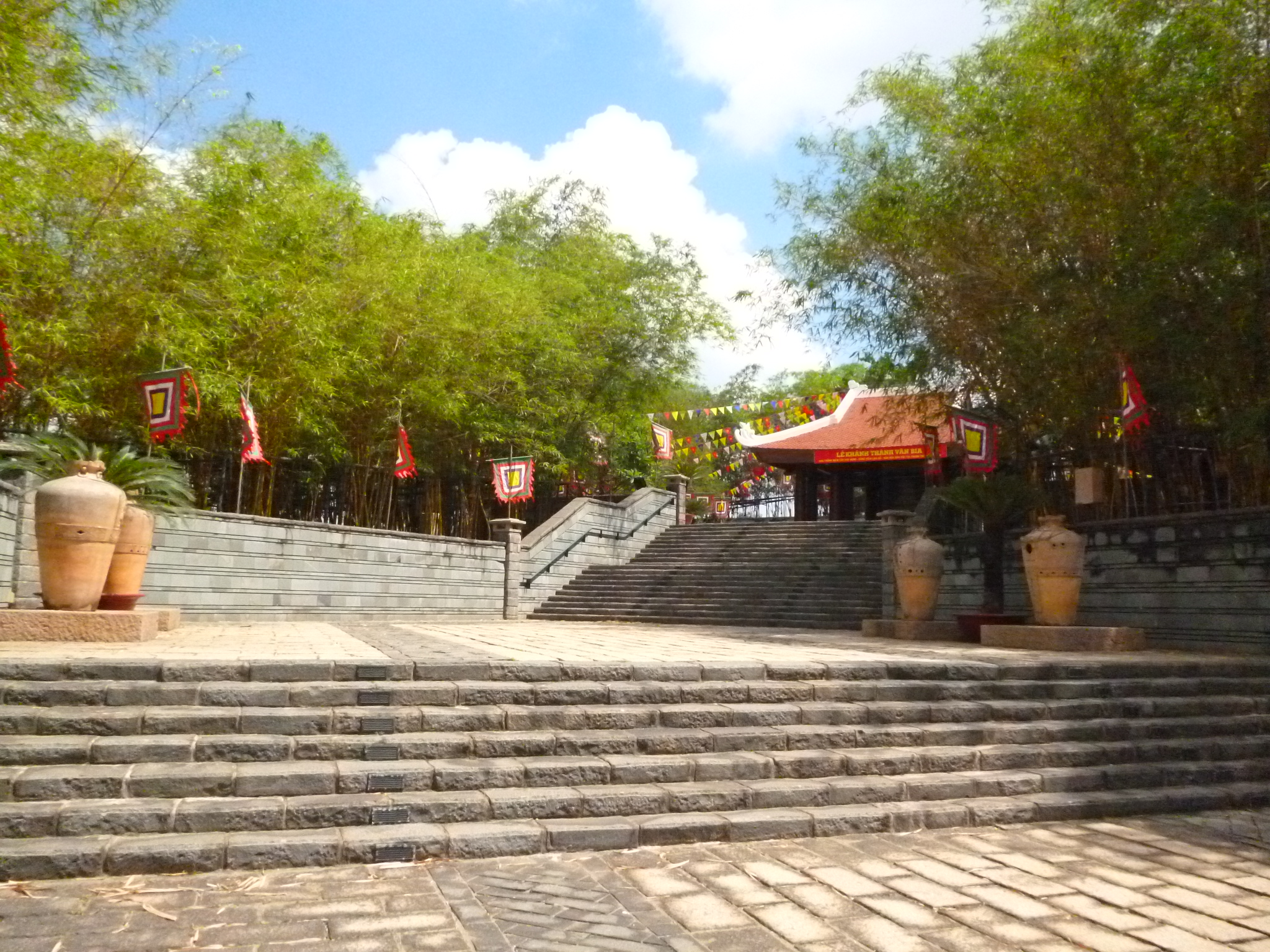
- National Historical and Cultural Park
- Interactive map of Long Bình
- Coordinates: 10°51′57″N 106°49′57″E
- Country: Vietnam
- Municipality: Ho Chi Minh City
- Established: June 16, 2025

Area
  - Total: 11.36 sq mi (29.43 km^{2})

Population (2024)
  - Total: 119,637
  - Density: 10,530/sq mi (4,065/km^{2})
- Time zone: UTC+07:00 (Indochina Time)
- Administrative code: 26833

Long Bình (Vietnamese: Phường Long Bình) is a ward of Ho Chi Minh City, Vietnam. It is one of the 168 new wards, communes and special zones of the city following the reorganization in 2025.

== History ==
On June 16, 2025, the National Assembly Standing Committee issued Resolution No. 1685/NQ-UBTVQH15 on the arrangement of commune-level administrative units of Ho Chi Minh City in 2025 (effective from June 16, 2025). Accordingly, the entire land area and population of Long Bình ward and the majority of Long Thạnh Mỹ ward of the former Thủ Đức city will be integrated into a new ward named Long Bình (Clause 72, Article 1).
