= Long Trường =

Long Trường Phường Long Trường Phú Hữu
- Ward
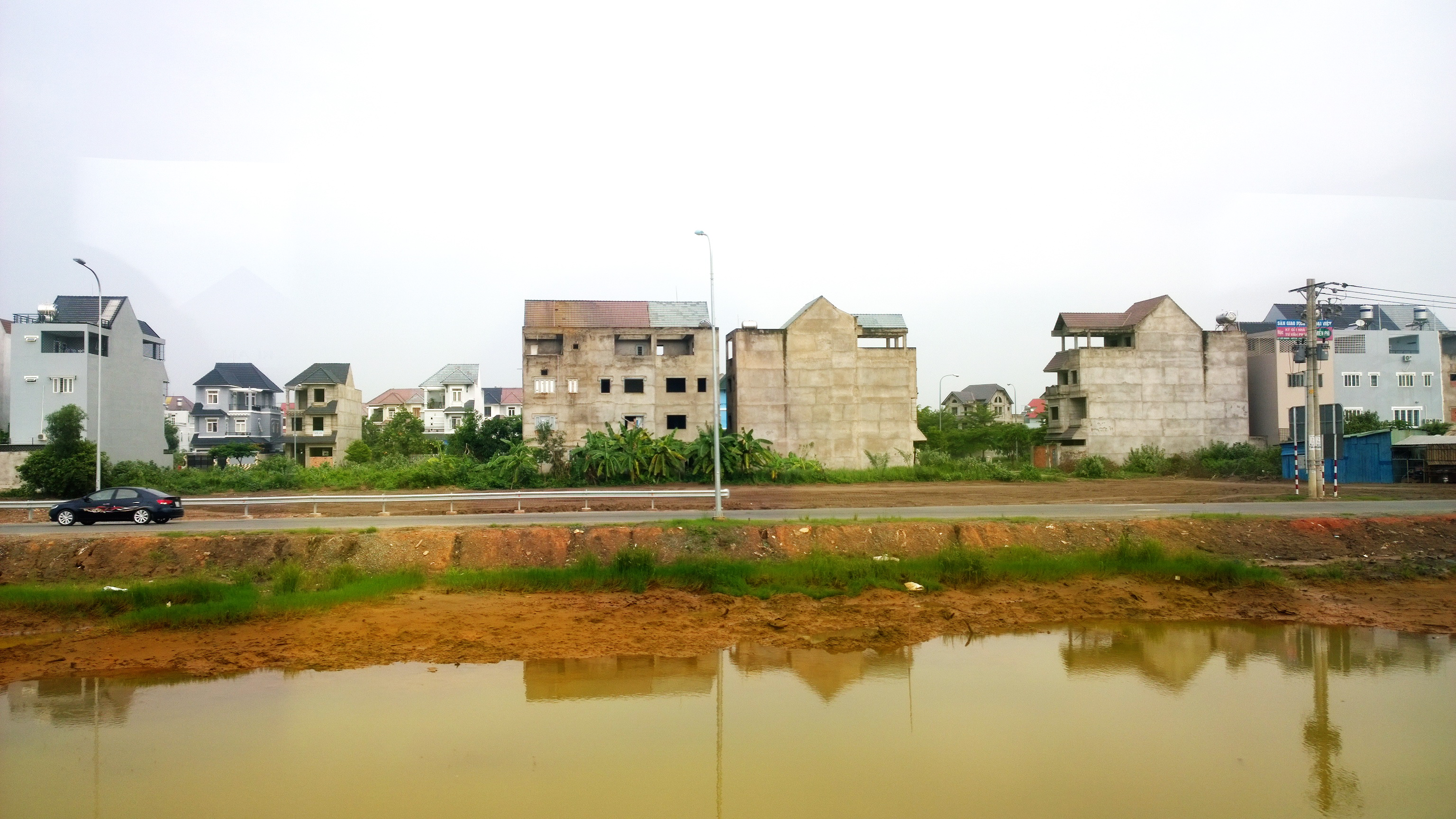
- A residential area in Long Trường
- Interactive map of Long Trường
- Coordinates: 10°47′47″N 106°49′19″E
- Country: Vietnam
- Municipality: Ho Chi Minh City
- Established: June 16, 2025

Area
  - Total: 9.46 sq mi (24.49 km^{2})

Population (2024)
  - Total: 73,669
  - Density: 7,791/sq mi (3,008/km^{2})
- Time zone: UTC+07:00 (Indochina Time)
- Administrative code: 26860

Long Trường (Vietnamese: Phường Long Trường) is a ward of Ho Chi Minh City, Vietnam. It is one of the 168 new wards, communes and special zones of the city following the reorganization in 2025.

== History ==
On June 16, 2025, the National Assembly Standing Committee issued Resolution No. 1685/NQ-UBTVQH15 on the arrangement of commune-level administrative units of Ho Chi Minh City in 2025 (effective from June 16, 2025). Accordingly, the entire land area and population of Phú Hữu and Long Trường wards of the former Thủ Đức city will be integrated into a new ward named Long Trường (Clause 74, Article 1).
