= South Korea Highway =

Road in Vietnam

South Korea Highway
- Quốc lộ 1
- Đỗ Mười (Station 2–An Sương section); Lê Đức Anh (An Sương–An Lạc section)
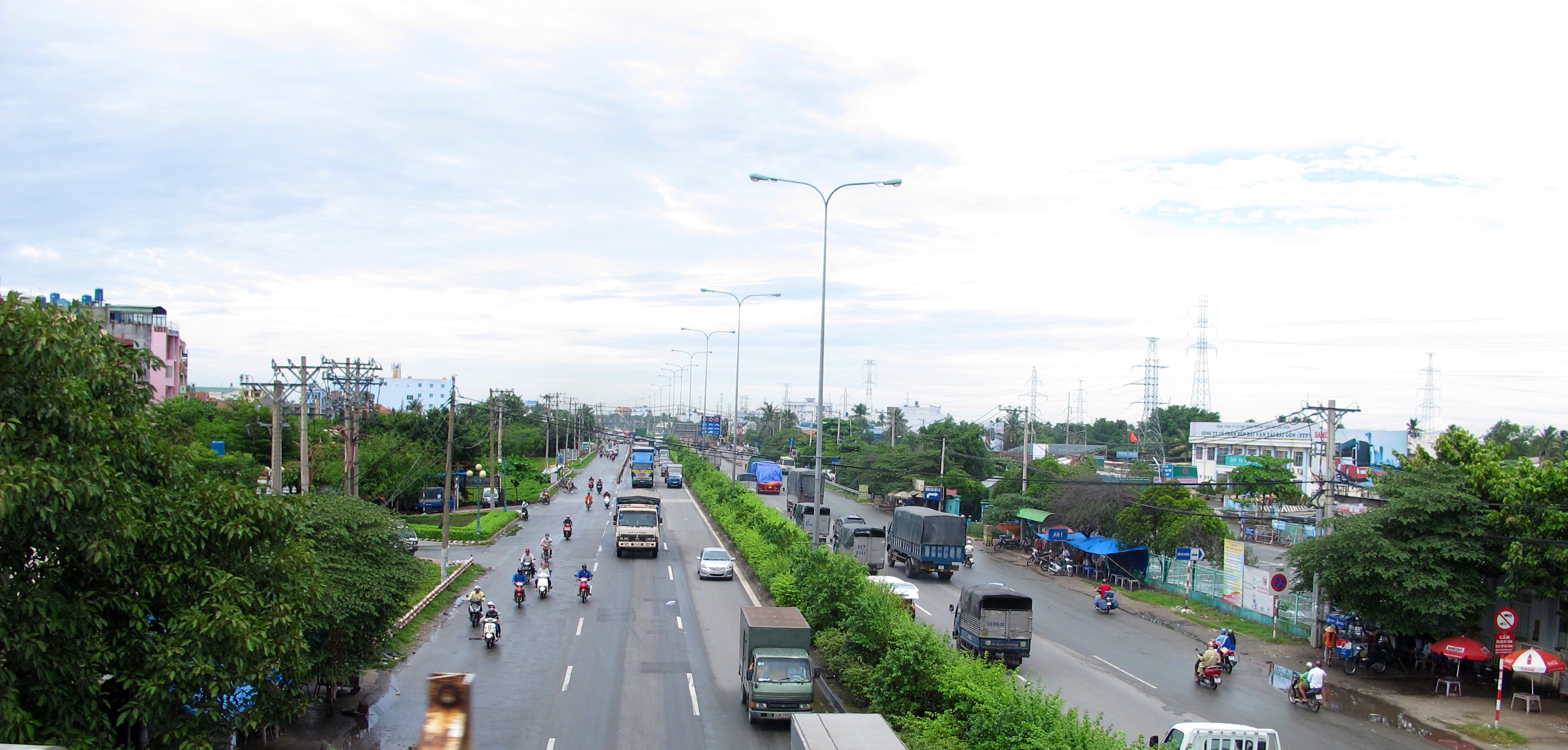
- South Korea Highway towards An Sương seen from Ngã tư Ga Overpass

Route information
- Part of AH1
- Length: 43.1 km (26.8 mi)
- Existed: 1973–present
- Component highways: Ring Road 2

Major junctions
- Northeast end: Station 2 interchange, Tăng Nhơn Phú
- Phạm Văn Đồng Boulevard at Linh Xuân intersection; AH17 at Bình Phước intersection, Hiệp Bình; AH1 Trường Chinh Boulevard at An Sương intersection, Bà Điểm, Đông Hưng Thuận and Trung Mỹ Tây, Ho Chi Minh City
- Southwest end: Kinh Dương Vương Boulevard, An Lạc Y-junction, An Lạc, Ho Chi Minh City

Location
- Country: Vietnam
- Municipalities: Ho Chi Minh City

Highway system
- Transport in Vietnam

South Korea Highway (Vietnamese: Xa lộ Đại Hàn) or initially known as Saigon Beltway (Xa lộ Vòng Đai Sài Gòn) is the beltway and a section of National Route 1 from Station 2 interchange in Tăng Nhơn Phú (Thủ Đức) to An Lạc junction in An Lạc, Ho Chi Minh City, dài 43,1 km.

== Etymology ==
The name Saigon Beltway originated from the route's purpose: to serve as a perimeter road protecting the Saigon–Tan Son Nhut Airport and the City of Saigon then, while simultaneously acting as a buffer between Saigon and Viet Cong forces in Củ Chi and Hóc Môn. The highway is also known as the South Korea Highway, as it was constructed by the Republic of Korea Military engineering corps between 1969 and 1970—following the Tet Offensive of the Vietnam War—in their capacity as an ally of the Republic of Vietnam.

Today, the section of the "Korean Highway" stretching from the Station 2 Interchane to the An Sương intersection—now renamed Đỗ Mười—spans 21.1 km and forms part of the AH1 of Asian Highway network, which connects Ho Chi Minh City with Phnom Penh and Bangkok. The AH1 continues along National Route 22, passing through Củ Chi toward the Mộc Bài border crossing into Cambodia. The total length of this Asian Highway segment within Ho Chi Minh City (extending to Củ Chi) is 43.6 km. The remaining portion of South Korea Highway, reaching toward An Lạc, is now known as Lê Đức Anh Boulevard.

== History ==
On August 5, 1964, the director of the Directorate of Highways under the Ministry of Public Works and Communications of South Vietnam proposed the construction of a highway encircling the capital city. According to the proposal, “the route would span 40 km, beginning at the Saigon–Bien Hoa Highway via an interchange. The new highway would skirt the southern edge of the University Village, separate the Thủ Đức Industrial Zone (place of Linh Trung EPZ nowadays) from the Cultural Village (place of VNU-HCM nowadays), and pass through the Gò Dưa Market area—a location well-suited for construction—while also enhancing security in the northern part of Thủ Đức. Although the section passing through An Phú Đông consists of marshy terrain, no better alternative exists, as the entire stretch along the Saigon River—from Bình Lợi Bridge toward Lái Thiêu—shares the same soil composition. Furthermore, this location is the most favorable point for constructing a bridge across the Saigon River and would bolster security in the An Phú Đông area. Between Tân Quy (in Đông Hưng Thuận) and Bà Hom (between Phú Lâm and Bình Trị Đông), the highway would facilitate the expansion of the capital into the western suburbs; currently, urban development within the capital tends to extend primarily along a southwest-to-northeast axis. The new highway would connect to National Highway 4 (now is part the National Route 1 in Mekong Delta) at An Lạc, forming a semi-circular route with an average radius of 10 to 12 kilometers.”

On August 13, 1964, the Ministry of Public Works and Communications approved the Directorate of Highways’ proposal and submitted it to the Deputy Prime Minister in charge of the pacification of Saigon, outlining the plan to establish a ring road encircling the northern periphery of the capital city of Saigon: “The new highway, encircling the northern part of the Saigon metropolitan area and spanning approximately 40 km, was designed to begin at the Saigon–Biên Hòa Highway, south of the University Village, cross National Highway 1 (now is National Route 1K) near Linh Xuân village, skirt the northern region of Thủ Đức, and reach Gò Dưa Market. The route would then traverse the An Phú Đông area, continue toward Tân Quy and Quán Tre, pass through Bà Điểm, Vĩnh Lộc, and Bà Hom, and finally connect with Công Lợi 4 at An Lạc.

The structural design of this new highway was to mirror that of the Saigon–Biên Hòa Highway; however, the roadway itself—surfaced with asphalt-treated crushed stone—was to be 7 meters wide, meeting the standards for a national highway with a capacity of 670 vehicles per hour.

The highway also included 580 meters of bridging, comprising eight individual bridges ranging from 12 to 85 meters in length, as well as a 300-meter-long bridge over the Saigon River (which is now Bình Phước Bridge).”

Acting on a proposal from the Ministry of Public Works and Communications, the Central Executive Committee of the Republic of Vietnam government issued Decree No. 167-GT/CC on August 11, 1965, authorizing the construction of a new highway to be known as the Saigon Beltway (Xa lộ Vòng đai Sài Gòn). The decree stated: “Authorization is hereby granted for the construction of the Saigon Beltway, extending from An Lạc through Bà Hom, Quán Tre, An Phú Đông, and Tam Bình commune, to the Thủ Đức University Village.”

Subsequently, on August 25, 1965, the Ministry of the Interior issued Decree No. 1281-BNV/HC/NĐ, initiating the first administrative inquiry for the purpose of land acquisition required for the construction of the Saigon Beltway. Accordingly, an administrative inquiry was scheduled for a twenty-day period, from September 6, 1965, to September 25, 1965, at the Administrative Office of Gia Định Province.

On April 22, 1966, the Central Executive Committee of the Republic of Vietnam government issued Decree No. 70-SL/CC, which declared the construction of the Saigon Beltway—stretching from An Lạc through Bà Hom, Quán Tre, An Phú Đông, and Tam Bình commune to the Thủ Đức University Village—to be a project of public utility and urgent necessity.

On May 21, 1966, the Ministry of the Interior issued Decree No. 491-BNV/HC/NĐ. According to this decree, a second administrative inquiry—aimed at the land acquisition required for the construction of the Saigon Beltway—was to be conducted over a 30-day period, from June 6, 1966, to July 5, 1966.

Construction of the Saigon Beltway took place between 1967 and 1973; upon its completion, the road was opened for use, with a total estimated cost of 260,000,000 South Vietnamese đồng. The establishment of this new thoroughfare served to strengthen the security defense system for the capital city of Saigon.

== Route information ==
=== Width ===
- Station 2 - An Sương (Đỗ Mười Boulevard): Verge 120m, cross-section width of 40m (8 lanes)
- An Sương - An Lạc (Lê Đức Anh Boulevard): Verge 120m, cross-section width of 35m (6 lanes), cross-section width of 40m for the section passing through Tân Tạo Industrial Park (7 lanes)

=== Current situation and extension ===
Serving as a logistics "backbone", this route carries the highest volume of heavy trucks and container vehicles in Ho Chi Minh City, acting as a vital artery for the movement of goods between the Mekong Delta, and the seaport system in the Southeast region. Consequently, it has become a hotspot for traffic congestion and accidents, frequently suffering from excessive traffic loads. Major intersections, such as Bình Phước and An Sương, face persistent gridlock during peak hours. Collisions between motorcycles and heavy vehicles—often involving container trucks encroaching on other lanes or motorcycles traveling in the wrong lanes—remain a critical and recurring issue.

To alleviate this traffic pressure, the city is currently developing and studying several mega-projects, leveraging the special mechanisms granted under Resolution 98:

- Expanding the western gateway: A feasibility study is underway to widen the section of National Route 1—stretching from the An Lạc junction toward the border with Long An province (now Tây Ninh province)—to 60 meters (accommodating 10–12 lanes). The project, estimated to cost trillions of Vietnamese dong, is proposed to be implemented under a BOT deal.
- Constructing grade-separated intersections: Plans include the addition of overpasses and underpasses at major junctions along the route, allowing vehicles to maintain a continuous flow at a design speed of 80 km/h without the need to stop for traffic lights.

== Notable sites ==
University of Economics and Law

South Korean Highway is a vital thoroughfare, part of the Ring Road 2 of Ho Chi Minh City, connecting the Southeastern and Southwestern regions of Vietnam. Most of Ho Chi Minh City’s major industrial zones are situated along this corridor), including the Tân Tạo, Tân Bình, Vĩnh Lộc, Tân Thới Hiệp, Linh Trung, Bình Chiểu, and Thủ Đức, as well as the Ho Chi Minh City Biotech Center, Saigon Hi-Tech Park and Quang Trung Software City.

Furthermore, the route passes by several significant higher education institutions, such as: Vietnam National University, Ho Chi Minh City, Nong Lam University, Nguyễn Tất Thành University, Văn Hiến University, Hoa Sen University, FPT Polytechnic, SaigonTech, VOV College.

Some other sites are: Suối Tiên Theme Park, Thủ Đức Wholesale Market for Agricultural Products and Foodstuffs, An Sương Market (An Sương Residential Area), An Sương Bus Terminus, Bà Hom Market, Go! An Lạc, Gò Mây Church, Gò Cát Solid Waste Treatment Site, Phú Lâm Transformer Station (Vietnam 500kV Transmission Line), etc.

== Bridges, Over and underpasses ==
- Bình Phước Bridge (8 lanes; crosses Saigon Bridge)
- Cả Bốn Bridge (8 lanes; crosses Bà Cả Bốn Creek)
- Rạch Sâu Bridge (8 lanes; crosses same name creek)
- Bến Cát Bridge (8 lanes; crosses same name river)
- Bình Phú Tây Bridge (8 lanes; crosses Cầu Sa Creek)
- Bình Thuận Bridge (6 lanes; crosses Tham Lương Creek)
- An Lập Bridge (6 lanes; crosses Tham Lương Creek)
- Station 2 Overpass (8 lanes)
- Linh Xuân Overpass (4 lanes)
- Sóng Thần Overpass (8 lanes)
- Gò Dưa Overpass (4 lanes)
- Bình Phước Intersection Overpass (6 lanes)
- Ngã 4 Ga Overpass (4 lanes)
- Tân Thới Hiệp Overpass (4 lanes)
- Quang Trung Overpass (4 lanes)
- An Sương Overpass (4 lanes)
- Gò Mây Overpass (6 lanes)
- Hương Lộ 2 Overpass (4 lanes)
- Võ Trần Chí Overpass (6 lanes)
- Provincial Road 10 Overpass (6 lanes)
- Provincial Road 10B Overpass (4 lanes)
- An Sương Underpass (4 lanes)
