= List of universities in Ho Chi Minh City =

List of universities, academies in Ho Chi Minh City. There are over 80 universities and colleges (for a full list of colleges in Ho Chi Minh City, see List of colleges in Ho Chi Minh City) with over 400,000 students. There are over 100 vocational schools in Ho Chi Minh City, Vietnam. The university students in Vietnam have to spend 4.5 to 5 years in university (when graduating, they will get a diploma of bachelor of arts (science faculties, basic faculty, social faculties) or engineer (technical faculties) while the college student spend about 3 to 3.5 years in colleges (then they may get a university diploma if they spend about 1.5 years in universities). The vocational school students spend 2 or 2.5 years).

== List ==
Universities in Ho Chi Minh City, Vietnam are tabulated alphabetically as follows:

- Vietnam Aviation Academy
- Ho Chi Minh City Cadre Academy
- Vietnam Youth Academy campus Southern
- Vietnam Women's Academy campus Southern
- Ho Chi Minh City University of Banking
- Conservatory of Ho Chi Minh City
- Hoa Sen University
- Gia Định University
- Hùng Vương University
- Ho Chi Minh City University of Architecture
- Fulbright University Vietnam
- Ho Chi Minh City University of Fine Arts
- Ho Chi Minh City University of Foreign Languages Information Technology - HUFLIT
- Ho Chi Minh City University of Industry and Trade (Trường Đại Học Công Thương Thành phố Hồ Chí Minh)
- Ho Chi Minh City International University
- Industrial University of Ho Chi Minh City (Trường Đại học Công nghiệp Thành phố Hồ Chí Minh)
- Ho Chi Minh City Medicine and Pharmacy University
- Ho Chi Minh City University of Education
- Ho Chi Minh City Open University
- Sài Gòn Business University
- Vietnamese - German University
- Ho Chi Minh City University of Agriculture and Forestry
- Ho Chi Minh City University of Culture
- Ho Chi Minh City University of Economics and Finance
- Ho Chi Minh City University of Economics and Law, VNU.HCMC
- Ho Chi Minh City University of Finance and Marketing (Trường Đại học Tài chính Marketing)
- Ho Chi Minh City University of Information Technology
- Ho Chi Minh City University of Law
- Ho Chi Minh City University of Social Sciences and Humanities
- Ho Chi Minh City University of Technology and Education
- University of Transport in Ho Chi Minh City (Trường Đại Học Giao Thông Vận Tải tại Thành phố Hồ Chí Minh)
- Hồng Bàng International University
- Ho Chi Minh city University of Technology (Trường Đại học Công nghệ Thành phố Hồ Chí Minh - HUTECH)
- Academy of Public Administration and Governance campus in Ho Chi Minh City (Phân hiệu Học viện Hành chính và Quản trị công tại Thành phố Hồ Chí Minh - APAG)
- Procuratorate University campus in Ho Chi Minh
- Nguyễn Tất Thành University
- Phạm Ngọc Thạch University of Medicine
- Academy of Posts and Telecommunications Institute of Technology campus in Ho Chi Minh City
- Royal Melbourne Institute of Technology University Vietnam campus in Ho Chi Minh City
- Greenwich University campus in Vietnam
- Saigon Institute of Information Technology
- Sài Gòn University
- Sài Gòn Technology University
- Ho Chi Minh City University of Pedagogy Sports
- Tôn Đức Thắng University
- University of Economics Ho Chi Minh City
- Ho Chi Minh City University of Sciences
- Swinburne University of Technology Vietnam campus in Ho Chi Minh city
- Vinhempich Military Technical Officer University school – Trần Đại Nghĩa University
- Military Culture – Arts University school
- Military Technical Academy – Lê Quý Đôn Technical Academy campus Southern
- Military Science Academy campus Southern
- Military Medical Academy – Lê Hữu Trác Medicine and Pharmacy Academy campus Southern
- Military Cryptography Technical Academy campus Southern
- Vietnam People's Security University (T04/T47)
- Vietnam People's Police University (T05/T48)
- Vietnam Buddhist Academy in Ho Chi Minh City
- Ho Chi Minh City University of Management and Technology Friendship
- Văn Hiến University
- Văn Lang University
- FPT University campus in Ho Chi Minh City
- Vietnam National University, Ho Chi Minh City
- Ho Chi Minh City University of Technology, VNU.HCMC (Trường Đại học Bách khoa TP. HCM,ĐHQGTP.HCM)
- Pacific Vietnam University campus in Ho Chi Minh City
- Second Campus of Hanoi University of Transport
- Second Campus of University of Foreign Trade
- Second Campus of University of Labor Social Affairs
- Second Campus of Thuyloi University

== See also ==
- Fulbright Economics Teaching Program (University of Economics)
- List of universities in Vietnam
- List of colleges in Ho Chi Minh City
