= Trung Mỹ Tây =

Trung Mỹ Tây Phường Trung Mỹ Tây Trung Chánh, Quán Tre, Tân Chánh Hiệp
- Ward
- MISA at Quang Trung Software Park
- Interactive map of Trung Mỹ Tây
- Coordinates: 10°51′21″N 106°36′57″E
- Country: Vietnam
- Municipality: Ho Chi Minh City
- Established: June 16, 2025

Area
  - Total: 2.68 sq mi (6.93 km^{2})

Population (2024)
  - Total: 126,470
  - Density: 47,300/sq mi (18,200/km^{2})
- Time zone: UTC+07:00 (Indochina Time)
- Administrative code: 26785

Trung Mỹ Tây (Vietnamese: Phường Trung Mỹ Tây) is a ward of Ho Chi Minh City, Vietnam. It is one of the 168 new wards, communes and special zones of the city following the reorganization in 2025.

== History ==
On June 16, 2025, the National Assembly Standing Committee issued Resolution No. 1685/NQ-UBTVQH15 on the arrangement of commune-level administrative units of Ho Chi Minh City in 2025 (effective from June 16, 2025). Accordingly, the entire land area and population of Tân Chánh Hiệp and Trung Mỹ Tây wards of the former District 12 will be integrated into a new ward named Trung Mỹ Tây (Clause 33, Article 1).

== Geography ==
Trung Mỹ Tây is 15 km to the northwest of Saigon, it adjacent to:

- Tân Thới Hiệp to the east
- Bà Điểm to the west Lê Quang Đạo Boulevard ( National Route 22 in former Hóc Môn district), Nguyễn Văn Thủ and Tô Ký
- Đông Hưng Thuận to the south by Đỗ Mười Boulevard ( South Korea Highway in former District 12, Ho Chi Minh City)
- Đông Thạnh to the east by roads of Bùi Văn Ngữ and Nguyễn Ảnh Thủ

According to Official Dispatch No. 2896/BNV-CQĐP dated May 27, 2025 of the Ministry of Home Affairs, following the merger, Trung Mỹ Tây war has a land area of 6.93 km², the population as of December 31, 2024 is 126,470 people, and density is 18,249 people/km² (Article 6 of Resolution No. 76/2025/UBTVQH15 dated April 14, 2025, of the National Assembly Standing Committee).

== Administration ==
Following the merger on June 16, 2025, Trung Mỹ Tây has 57 neighborhoods numbered from 1 to 57.

== Facilities ==
The ward is home to key facilities vital to national defense and security, and makes a significant contribution to the city's economy, technology, and technical capabilities, including:

- Quán Tre Broadcasting Station (Đài Phát sóng Quán Tre), existed prior to 1975, plays a pivotal role in expanding radio coverage, ensuring the dissemination of national information, and connecting telecommunications infrastructure in the Southern region.
- Quang Trung Software City (QTSC) is the first and largest centralized information technology park in Vietnam, playing a pivotal role in shaping the digital economy and serving as a technological driving force for Ho Chi Minh City. According to an international assessment by KPMG, QTSC ranks third among eight prominent technology parks in Asia in terms of operational efficiency. The Data and Backup Center of Ho Chi Minh City Stock Exchange is located here.
- The Gia Định Regiment (under the Ho Chi Minh City Command) holds great significance as the first major concentrated combat unit established in the Saigon–Gia Định region during the resistance war. With a proud, heroic tradition, the unit now plays a pivotal role in guarding the city's gateways, maintaining security, and training the city's armed forces. The QTSC area was part of it formerly.
