= Đồng Thị Bích Thuỷ =

Vietnamese informatics specialist

- Born: 10 December 1954; Phú Vang district, Thừa Thiên Huế province, Vietnam
- Died: 9 February 2017 (aged 62); Ho Chi Minh City, Vietnam
- Occupation: University professor
- Known for: Early pioneer of informatics management in Vietnam
- Spouse: Lương Văn Lý

Đồng Thị Bích Thuỷ (1954 –2017) was a professor of management informatics who is considered one of the pioneers of the use of informatics in Vietnam. She was a member of the Tenth National Assembly of Vietnam.

== Early life and education ==
Đồng Thị Bích Thuỷ was born on 10 December 1954 in Phú Vang district, in the Thừa Thiên Huế province of Vietnam. She graduated in business administration from the University of Lausanne in Switzerland in 1975 and obtained a PhD in management informatics from the University of Geneva in Switzerland in 1986, defending a thesis on information systems and financial informatics databases.

== Career ==
Đồng Thị Bích Thuỷ started teaching in 1986 as head of the Information Systems Department at the Ho Chi Minh City University of Science (formerly the University of Natural Sciences). Initially, she found it difficult to get a job because businesses were suspicious of people with a PhD, particularly women, and because few had given any consideration to the need for informatics. Those who had studied information technology (IT) knew how to programme but were failing to take the needs of management into consideration, resulting in managers having to tailor their work to the needs of the IT, rather than the other way round. In 1991 she was the only teacher of the first graduate courses in informatics, until the university had more staff with PhD qualifications. From 1995 to 1999 she was the vice dean of the IT Department and the head of the Information Systems Department. In 1997, she was asked to represent intellectuals in the science and technology sector as a member of the Tenth National Assembly (1997-2002). At the beginning of 2002, she became the vice chancellor of the University of Science and Technology, holding this position until 2007. Despite this management responsibility, she continued to publish widely.

In addition to her expertise in IT, she was also very interested in innovating teaching and learning methods at the university level. In 2007, she and the management board of the Ho Chi Minh City University of Science established the Centre for Research on Improvement of University Teaching and Learning Methods together with Portland State University in Oregon, US. This was the first organization in Vietnam aiming to help support teachers and students in the teaching and learning process. She and her colleagues were the first people to introduce the concept of service-learning to Vietnam. She held the position of director until her death. From 2013 to 2017 she was also a training advisor at the John von Neumann Institute at the Vietnam National University, Ho Chi Minh City.

== Awards and honours ==
Đồng Thị Bích Thuỷ was recognized by the state as an associate professor in 2004. She received the "Women shouldering social responsibilities" award from the Canadian government at the end of 1999; an award from the Ho Chi Minh Communist Youth Union in 2000; and the 5th Ho Chi Minh City Information and Communication Technology Award in 2013. Fluent in both English and French, she was president of the association of French-speaking universities in the Asia-Pacific region (CONFRASIE) from 1998 to 2010.

== Personal life ==
Đồng Thị Bích Thuỷ married Lương Văn Lý, former deputy director of the Department of Foreign Affairs and the Department of Planning and Investment of Ho Chi Minh City. They had two daughters.

== Death ==
Đồng Thị Bích Thuỷ died on 9 February 9, 2017. Her body was cremated at Phúc An Viên Cemetery, Ho Chi Minh City on 12 February. Her death led to many reminiscences about her contribution, including the story of a Chinese informatics businessman who was visiting Ho Chi Minh City around 1992. He had concluded that there was no business for him in Vietnam, until he saw a hotel employee working with a computer. He enquired where the student had learnt about IT and, as a result, met with Đồng Thị Bích Thuỷ. She, in turn, introduced him to the head of informatics in Ho Chi Minh City, and this resulted in the company investing in Vietnam, possibly advancing the use of ICT in the country by several years.
