= List of colleges in Ho Chi Minh City =

List of colleges in Ho Chi Minh City, Vietnam, the italic part is in Vietnamese.

- Cetana PSB Intellis International College
- College of Technology & Business Administration (Cao đẳng Bán công Công nghệ & Quản trị doanh nghiệp)
- College of Marketing (Cao đẳng Bán công Marketing)
- College of Foodstuff Process (Cao đẳng Công nghệ Thực phẩm)
- College of Industry IV (Cao đẳng Công nghiệp IV) Renamed to Industrial University of Ho Chi Minh City.
- College of Information Technology (Cao đẳng Dân lập Công nghệ thông tin)
- College of Transportation 3 (Cao đẳng Giao thông Vận tải 3)
- College of Foreign Trade (Cao đẳng Kinh tế đối ngoại)
- College of Economics and Industrial Engineering (Cao đẳng Kinh tế Kỹ thuật Công nghiệp)
- College of Technology (Cao đẳng Kỹ nghệ dân lập)
- Technical College of VINHEMPICH (Cao đẳng Kỹ thuật VINHEMPICH)
- College of Dramatics and Cinematics (Cao đẳng Sân khấu Điện ảnh Thành phố Hồ Chí Minh)
- College of Kindergarten Teacher Training (Cao đẳng Sư phạm Mẫu giáo TW3)
- College of Physical Training TW2 (Cao đẳng Sư phạm Thể dục TW2)
- College of Teacher Training of Ho Chi Minh City (Cao đẳng Sư phạm Thành phố Hồ Chí Minh)
- College of Finance and Accounting IV (Cao đẳng Tài chính Kế toán IV)
- College of Culture and Arts of Ho Chi Minh City (Cao đẳng Văn hóa Nghệ thuật Thành phố Hồ Chí Minh)
- College of Culture of Ho Chi Minh City (Cao đẳng Văn hóa Thành phố Hồ Chí Minh)
- College of Civil Construction 2 (Cao đẳng Xây dựng số 2)
- Saigon Technology University

== See also ==
- List of universities in Ho Chi Minh City
