= Kim Chung Tran =

Vietnamese entrepreneur (born 1967)

Tran Kim Chung
- Born: June 2, 1967 (age 59); Bình Định, Vietnam
- Known for: CT Group Corporation (Founding Chairman); Honorary Consul of Portugal; Vice President of Vietnam - Japan Friendship Association in Ho Chi Minh City; Secretary General of Vietnam - Malaysia Friendship Association; Member of the Scientific Council, Ho Chi Minh City University of Economics

Trần Kim Chung (1967) is a Vietnam entrepreneur, who serves as the Chair for CT Group. He is the Honorary Consul of Portugal in Hanoi. In 2022, he was awarded the Second-class Labor Order by the Government of Vietnam.

Born in Binh Dinh province, Vietnam, he graduated from the Faculty of Foreign Trade at the University of Economics Ho Chi Minh City (UEH) and attended training programs at Harvard University in the United States.
