= Quang Trung National Training Center =

South Vietnamese Army training school

- Hóc Môn district, Saigon, Vietnam
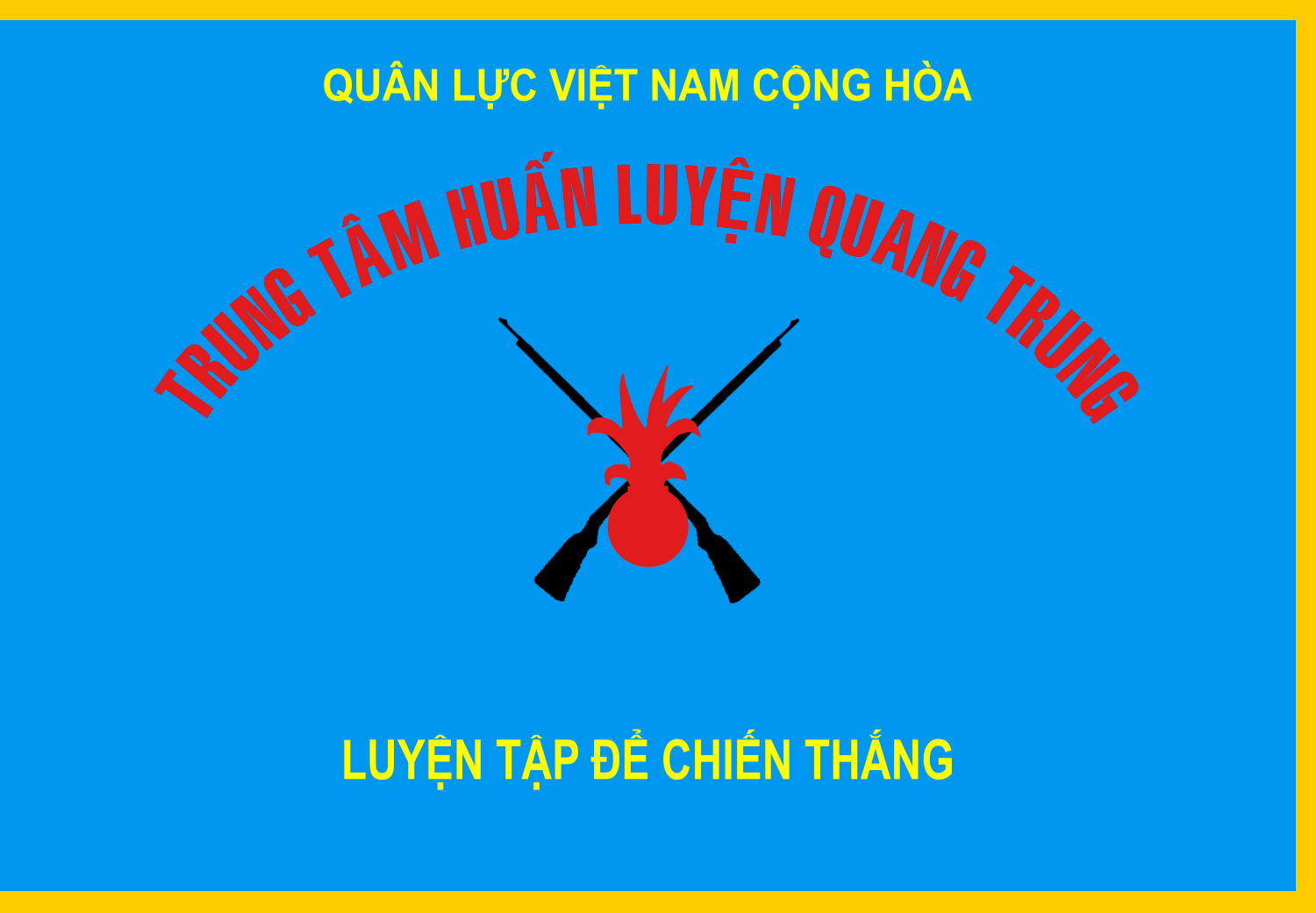
- Flag of the Quang Trung National Training Center

Site information
- Type: Military Academy
- Owner: Vietnamese National Army; Army of the Republic of Vietnam

Location
- Coordinates: 10.853°N 106.628°E

Site history
- Built: 1953
- In use: 1953–1975
- Battles/wars: Vietnam War

Quang Trung National Training Center was a basic training school of the South Vietnamese Army of the Republic of Vietnam (ARVN). It was located in Quán Tre village, Hóc Môn district, Gia Định province (now Trung Mỹ Tây), northwest of the capital Saigon.

== History ==
The center was originally established in 1953 and located on Highway 1 approximately 16km northwest of Saigon as Quán Tre National Training Center and renamed as Quang Trung National Training Center in the time of Republic of Vietnam.

In the mid-1950s, the Quang Trung Training Center was the principal ARVN training establishment providing eight weeks of basic training to all recruits and reservists and advanced courses to infantry soldiers. It had an annual capacity of approximately 24,000 (or about 8,000 at any one time). In 1956 the commanding general was described by the US Army attaché as a "pompous, fat, stupid man ... who will do anything to increase his personal fortune." He was reportedly financing a brothel run by his mistress. In 1959 US advisors assessed that the hours devoted to various subjects were not sufficient for the draftee to properly absorb the instruction, this was particularly true of marksmanship.

In January 1957 the ARVN Transportation School, located at Thủ Đức Military Academy was temporarily split. The regional driver and second echelon mechanic courses moved to Quang Trung, while the rest of the school remained at Thủ Đức. In September 1958, the school was consolidated back into one location at Quang Trung. The school's mission remained essentially the same as when it was established in 1955, training drivers, mechanics and noncommissioned officers, but it now had an increased training capacity of 700 students.

During 1964 recruit training was drastically changed. At the beginning of the year plans called for the training of 30,000 recruits at the Quang Trung, and in January the Military Assistance Command, Vietnam (MACV) advisory group recommended that the programs of instruction for basic combat training and advanced individual training be revised to eliminate duplication and correspond more closely to counterinsurgency requirements. This extensive revision was accomplished by March. In May 1964 MACV recommended that recruit training be expanded from Quang Trung to four other national training centers and to the Ranger Training Center at Dục Mỹ Camp.

In 1967 following an investigation by the Joint General Staff (JGS), Colonel Vu Ngoc Tuan, commandant of the center, was found to have used military real estate, materiel and trainee labor to build an ice-making plant nearby. Tuan and several other officers, including the director of the Central Logistics Command, General Nhon were relieved and demoted.

In June 1971 the JGS Central Training Command introduced a six-week method of instruction course for military instructors at Quang Trung.

On 29 April 1975 the People's Army of Vietnam 10th Division attacked the center as it moved down Highway 1 to attack Tan Son Nhut Air Base.

After the Fall of Saigon, the center was used as a re-education camp for South Vietnamese military and government personnel. Since 2000, the site has been redeveloped into Quang Trung Software City and opened in 2001.

== List of Commandants ==
- Colonel Vu Ngoc Tuan
- General Le Ngoc Trien
- General Hoang Van Lac
- General Phạm Văn Phú (1973-November 1974)
