= American International School Vietnam =

Coordinates: 10.6578526°N 106.7256113°E

Information
- Established: 2006
- Closed: January 12, 2026
- Grades: K-12
- Language: English

The American International School Vietnam (AISVN), formerly American International School (AIS) was a private, international school in Ho Chi Minh City (Saigon), Vietnam. Formed in 2006 with the purpose of providing an American-style education for Vietnamese students, the school enrolled roughly 900 students in grades K-12 of which 90% are Vietnamese in the first 3 years of its existence.

The school became the subject of financial issues beginning in the 2023-2024 academic year, which ultimately resulted in the school's temporary closure and eventual dissolution in the subsequent years.

== Curriculum ==
American International School Vietnam used English as the medium of instruction. It offered the International Baccalaureate Diploma Program.

== Ownership and finances ==
The Intellectual Resources Management Co., which owns the school, is also the owner of the Saigon Institute of Technology (SaigonTech). AISVN operated in Long Thới Commune, Nhà Bè District, Ho Chi Minh City. The campus had opened in August 2014 with previous campuses in Bình Thạnh District, District 1 and District 10.

In the 2023/24 academic year, AISVN encountered financial issues which resulted in the non-payment or late payment of salaries to teachers and administration staff over a number of months. As a result, the school chose to end the academic year early in April 2024, with students studying for the IB Diploma permitted to sit their examinations.

Consequently, AISVN was suspended from operations by the Ho Chi Minh City Department of Education and Training from July 1st, 2024. In addition, local tax authorities recommended in August 2024 that its licence be revoked.

In November 2024, the school announced that it intended to reopen in January 2025, but as of February 2025, the school website remains a holding page.

On January 12, 2026, the People's Committee of Ho Chi Minh City officially announced the decision to dissolve the American International School (encompassing Primary, Middle, and High School levels), commonly referred to as AISVN. This event occurred more than six months after the school's owner was arrested and prosecuted for violations regarding large-scale capital mobilization—amounting to trillions of VND—from parents.

According to the decision by the state management agency, the AIS American International Education Joint Stock Company (the investor) and the school administration are responsible for executing liquidation procedures and resolving legal consequences related to personnel, finance, assets, and land.

Specifically, the entity is obligated to fully settle outstanding debts, including tax liabilities and overdue payments for social and health insurance. Concurrently, the school must ensure the rights of employees by paying salaries and contractual allowances, as well as refunding tuition and unused fees to students in accordance with current laws.

== Accreditation ==
The school was licensed by the IBO to teach the PYP, MYP and IBDP programs. The school was also accredited by both CIS and WASC. The licenses and accreditations were withdrawn in early 2024.
