= Phan Văn Hớn =

Vietnamese farmer (c.1830–1886)

Phan Văn Hớn (c. 1830–1886) also called Phan Công Hớn was a Vietnamese farmer who led a revolt against the French in Saigon in 1885. The rural revolt occurred in the Mười tám Thôn vườn trầu ("Eighteen Betel Nut Gardens" vi:18 thôn vườn trầu) of Hóc Môn District's Bà Điểm commune.
