= Ho Chi Minh City Stock Exchange =

Securities trading center in Vietnam

Hochiminh Stock Exchange
- Ho Chi Minh City Stock Exchange

- Façade of the Ho Chi Minh Stock Exchange Tower on Bến Nghé Canal
- Type: Stock exchange
- Location: Ho Chi Minh City, Vietnam
- Coordinates: 10°46′06″N 106°42′07″E
- Founded: July 20, 2000; 26 years ago
- Owner: Vietnam Stock Exchange under State Securities Commission of Vietnam
- Key people: Trịnh Sơn Hồng (Chair); Nguyễn Thị Việt Hà (General Director)
- Currency: Vietnamese đồng
- No. of listings: 771 (October 2026)
- Market cap: ₫7.9267 trillion ($306.11 million) (October 2026)
- Indices: VN-Index; VN30 Equal Weight Index
- Website: hsx.vn

Ho Chi Minh Stock Exchange (HoSE, HOSE, or HSX; Vietnamese: Sở Giao dịch Chứng khoán Thành phố Hồ Chí Minh, lit. 'Department for Stock Exchange of Ho Chi Minh City'), formerly the HCMC Securities Trading Center (HoSTC; Trung tâm Giao dịch Chứng khoán TP.HCM), is a stock exchange headquartered at the Exchange Tower in the Financial District, Saigon ward, former District 1 of Ho Chi Minh City, Vietnam. The HoSE is the largest stock exchange in Vietnam. It is owned by the Vietnam Stock Exchange.

== History ==
Chambre de commerce de Saïgon 1920s

The original Ho Chi Minh City Stock Exchange building is an architectural structure built during the French colonial era with the address 45 Quai de Belgique. It was originally the headquarters of the Saigon Chamber of Commerce (French: Chambre de commerce de Saïgon; Vietnamese: Phòng Thương mại Sài Gòn). In 1957, the building was handed over to the government of the Republic of Vietnam and became the Senate House of National Assembly of the Republic of Vietnam known as Diên Hồng Palace (Vietnamese: Hội trường Diên Hồng), where government conferences were held with the address 45 Bến Chương Dương (Chương Dương Quay). From 1967, Diên Hồng Palace became the headquarters of the Senate of the Republic of Vietnam [vi] until the Fall of Saigon in 1975. After 1975, the building temporarily housed several agencies and units of the Ho Chi Minh City government. In 1999, the People's Committee of Ho Chi Minh City decided to hand over the building to be the headquarters of the Stock Exchange.

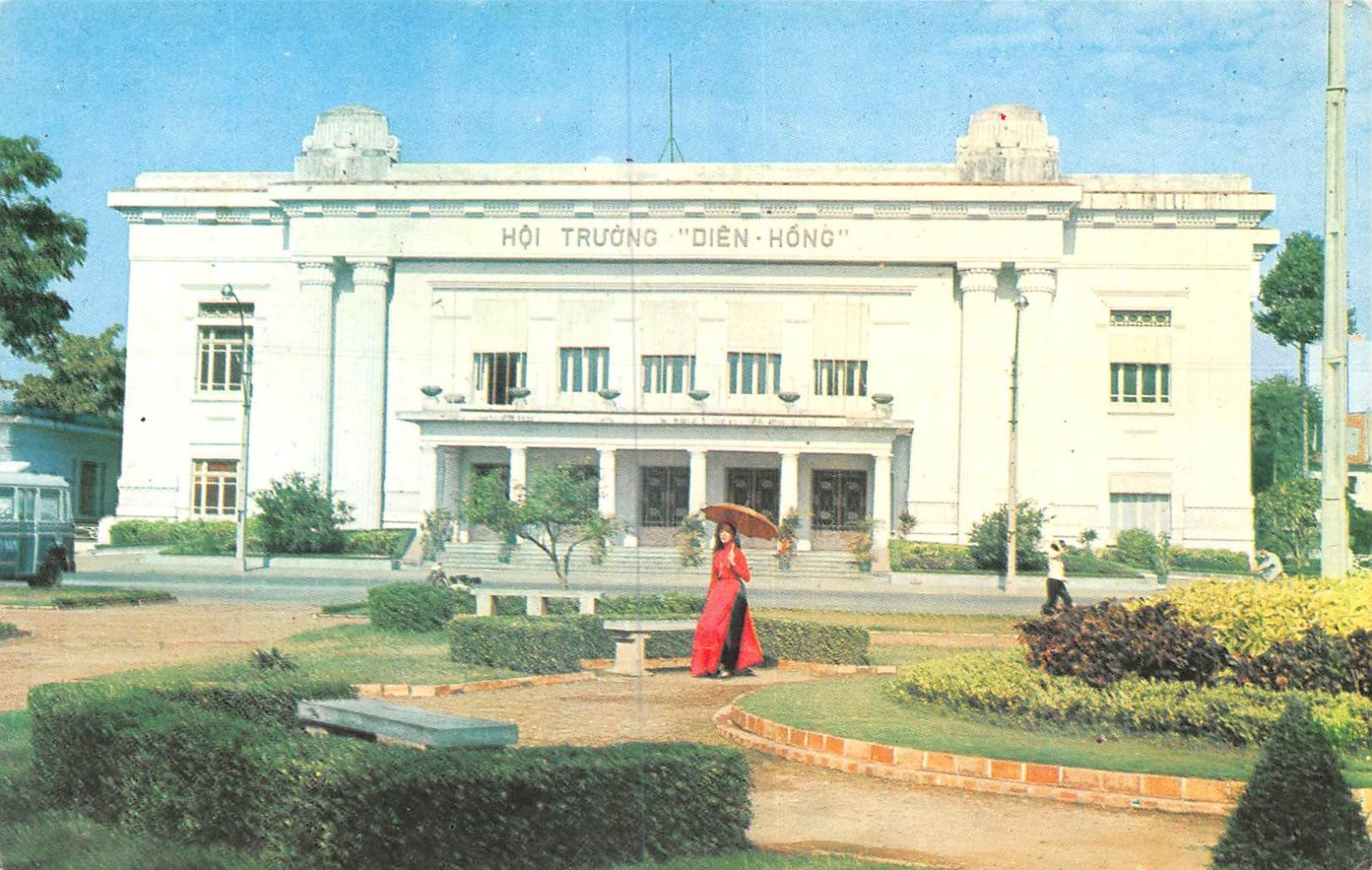
Diên Hồng Palace, Saigon in the 1960s

The stock exchange was established in 1998 under Decision No. 127/1998/QD-TTg of the Prime Minister of Vietnam as HCMC Securities Trading Center. It officially opened on July 20, 2000, and had its first trading session on July 28, 2000, with two listed companies and six security company members.

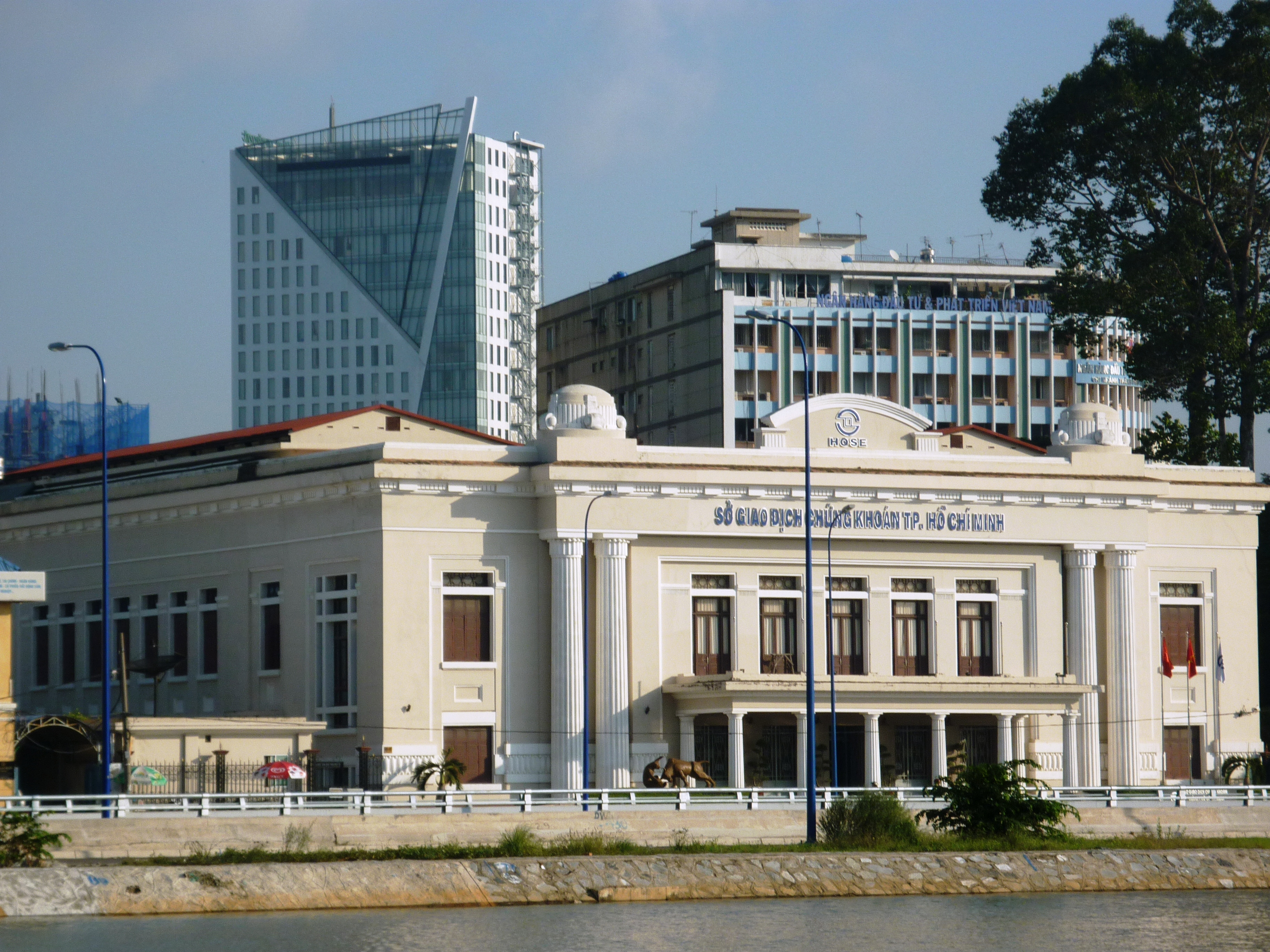
Ho Chi Minh Stock Exchange in 2011

According to Decision No. 599/2007/QD-TTg of the Prime Minister in 2007, HCM Securities Trading Center was transformed into HCM Stock Exchange, with initial charter capital of VND 1,000 billion and the Ministry of Finance as the owner representing the agency. As of its 14th anniversary, the new 12-story Exchange Tower behind the older building was inaugurated with address of No. 1 Nam Kỳ Khởi Nghĩa Street, while the former building has changed as 16 Võ Văn Kiệt Boulevard, as of the East–West Highway was completed and Chương Dương Quay with the Hàm Tử Quay and Lê Quang Liêm Quay (later changed as Trần Văn Kiểu Street in 1985) were merged into one. The charter capital was adjusted to VND 2,000 billion in 2015. In 2016, Data and Backup Center in the Quang Trung Software City was completed.

The Prime Minister issued Decision No. 37/2020/QD-TTg on December 23, 2020, establishing the Vietnam Stock Exchange. Accordingly, The Hanoi Stock Exchange and Ho Chi Minh Stock Exchange became subsidiaries with 100% of charter capital owned by the Vietnam Stock Exchange.

== Overview ==
=== Capital ===
Vietnam Stock Exchange was established as a one-member limited liability company to organize a security trading market. Its VND 3,000 billion charter capital is held by the State. It has bank accounts with the State Treasury and domestic commercial banks that do business in Vietnamese đồng and foreign currencies. By national law, the exchange is tasked with financial regimes, statistical reporting, accounting, and auditing.

=== Buildings ===
The Ho Chi Minh Stock Exchange Headquarter building or also known as the Exchange Tower is located on streets of Nguyễn Công Trứ, Nam Kỳ Khởi Nghĩa and Võ Văn Kiệt Blvd., Bến Thành, in the Financial District. While the Data and Backup Center is about 15km to the northwest in Quang Trung Software City, Trung Mỹ Tây, both are in Ho Chi Minh City.

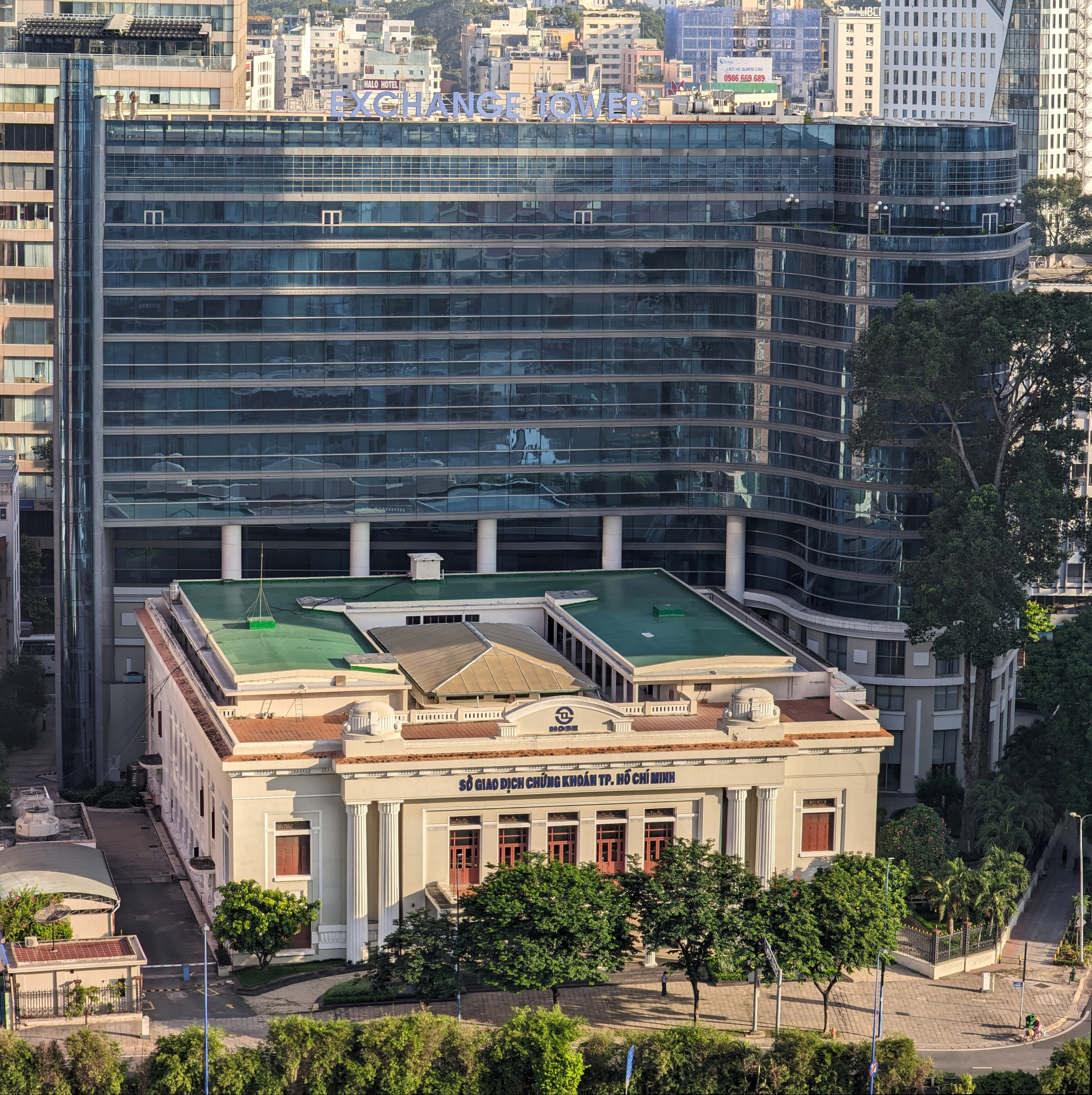
Ho Chi Minh Stock Exchange at day

Ho Chi Minh Stock Exchange at night

Ho Chi Minh Stock Exchange entrance at Exchange Tower

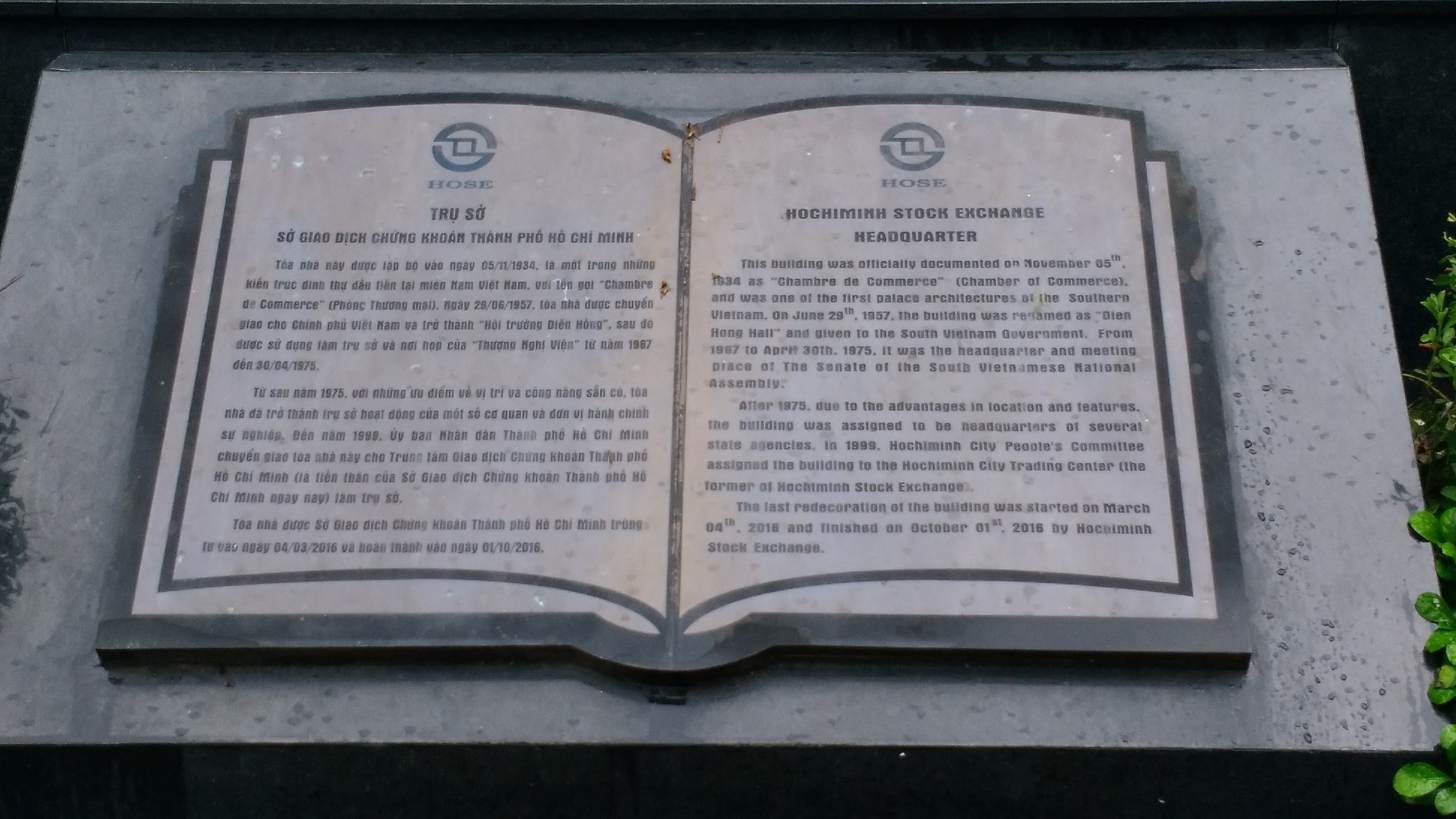
Sculpture book of Ho Chi Minh Stock Exchange Headquarter brief history

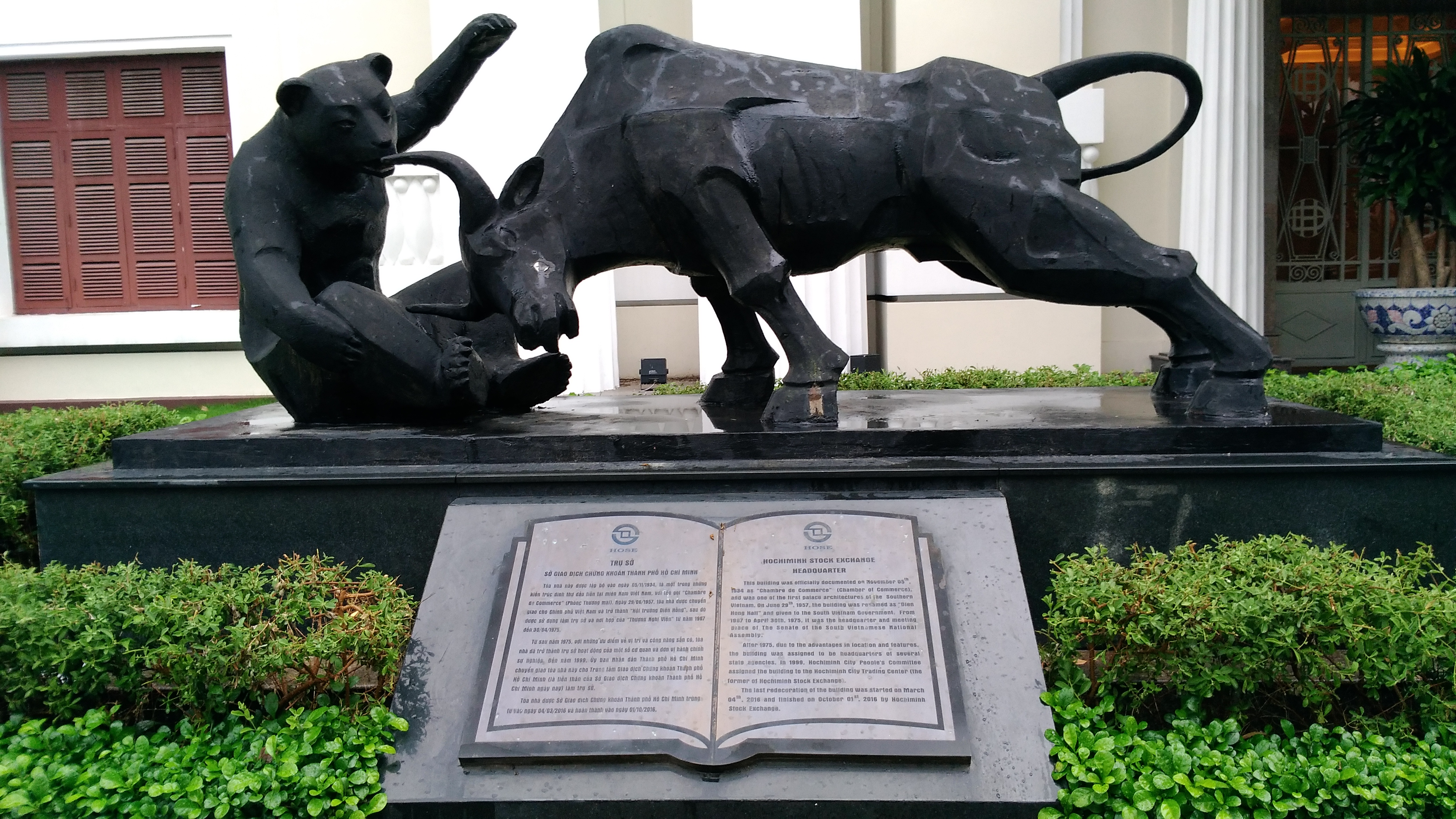
Statue of Bull and bear markets

== Products ==
=== Trading products ===
Currently, Ho Chi Minh Stock Exchange is trading securities products such as stocks, closed fund certificates, ETF certificates, and covered warrants.

=== Indices ===
==== VNIndex ====
VNIndex (or VN Index, and sometimes abbreviated as VNI) was the first and is currently the mainline index representing the Vietnamese stock market. It compares the current values of market capital to the base value of market capital. The value of market capital is calculated by the index formula which is adjusted in scenarios such as new listings, delistings, and changes in listing capital. VNIndex calculating formula: VN Index = (Current market value / Base market value) x 100

==== HOSE index ====
The HOSE Index was launched in 2014. It allows HOSE's listing stocks to reach requirements on eligibility, free-floating rate, and liquidity. HOSE Index accounts for more than 90% trading value and more than 80% capital value of listing Vietnamese stocks in HOSE.

Structure of HOSE Index:

- VNAllshare is a capitalization index consisting of stocks listed on HOSE that meet the screening requirements for eligibility, freely transferable ratio, and liquidity.
- VN30 is a capitalization index designed to measure the growth of the top thirty companies in terms of market capitalization and liquidity in VNAllshare.
- VNMidcap is a capitalization index that measures the growth of seventy medium-sized companies in VNAllshare.
- VN100: is a market capitalization index combining component stocks of VN30 and VNMidcap.
- VNSmallcap is a capitalization index designed to measure the growth of small-sized companies in VNAllshare.
- VNAllshare Sector Indices include industry indices with VNAllshare's component stocks, classified according to the Global Industry Classification Standard (GICS®).
- VNSI is a price index calculated using the free-float adjusted market capitalization method with the composition of the listed companies with the best sustainable development scores. It has a real-time calculation frequency of five seconds.

==== Sector indices ====
Currently, HOSE has ten sector indices:

- Consumers sector (VNCONS)
- Energy sector (VNENE)
- Financial sector (VNFIN)
- Healthcare sector (VNHEAL)
- Material sector (VNMAT)
- Industrial sector (VNIND)
- Information Technology Sector (VNIT)
- Material sector (VNMAT)
- Real Estate sector (VNREAL)
- Utilities sector (VNUTI)

==== Investment indices ====
In November 2019, HOSE introduced a modified index to adapt to the investment needs of domestic fund companies. Specifically, the Vietnam Leading Financial Index (VNFIN LEAD) Vietnam Financial Select Sector Index (VNFINSELECT), and Vietnam Diamond Index (VN DIAMOND).

== Trading activity ==
Ho Chi Minh Stock Exchange in New Year's Eve

The Ho Chi Minh Stock Exchange trades Monday through Friday, except on public holidays. The trading limit for stocks and fund certificates is +/-7%; this does not apply to bonds. On the first trading day of a new listing stock, the trading limit is +/-20%.

== Listing on HOSE ==
Listing requirements, applied according to Decree 155/2020/ND-CP detailing

Criteria	Requirement
Business Form	joint stock company
Charter capital contributed at the time of registration	VND 120 billion
Minimum capital	30 billion VND
Trading time on UPCOM	Approved for listing by the general meeting of shareholders and trading on the Upcom trading system for at least two years, except when shares have been offered to the public.
Financial situation and business activities	ROE of the previous year at least 5%, two consecutive years of profit, no debt overdue for more than one year, no accumulated loss
Shareholders structure	At least 15% of the voting shares are held by at least 100 non-major shareholders If the charter capital of the organization is VND 1,000 billion or more, the minimum ratio is 10% of the voting shares.
Shares holding requirements	Members of the board, control board, board of directors, chief accountant, CFO, and equivalent managerial positions elected by the general meeting of shareholders or appointed by the board of directors and major shareholders. If related to the above, subjects must commit to holding 100% of the shares owned within six months from the first trading date on the Stock Exchange and 50% of these shares within the next six months, excluding the number of state-owned shares held by the above individuals
Requirements on compliance with the Securities Law	The company and its legal representative shall not be handled for violations within two years due to the performance of prohibited acts in securities and securities market activities.
Consulting securities company	Has a securities company that advises on the application for listing registration unless the organization registering for listing is a securities company.
Listing registration documents	Sufficient according to regulations

== See also ==
- Economy of Vietnam
- Hanoi Stock Exchange
- List of Southeast Asian stock exchanges
