= Saigon Institute of Technology =

Educational Institute in Ho Chi Minh City, Vietnam

The Saigon Institute of Technology is an educational institution located in Quang Trung Software Park, District 12, Ho Chi Minh City, Vietnam.
