= Quang Trung Software City =

Coordinates: 10°51′14″N 106°37′42″E

- Interactive map of Quang Trung Software City
- Location: Quán Tre, Trung Mỹ Tây, Ho Chi Minh City, Vietnam
- Opening date: March 16, 2001; 25 years ago
- Developer: Ho Chi Minh City People's Council and People's Committee
- Manager: Quang Trung Software City Development Co. Ltd.
- Public transit: L8 QTSC station (proposed)
- Website: QTSC

Quang Trung Software City (Vietnamese: Công viên phần mềm Quang Trung), also known as Quang Trung Software Park, and abbreviated as QTSC, is a tech hub and business park in Trung Mỹ Tây, Ho Chi Minh City. It is approximately 15 kilometres (9.3 mi) to the northwest from the representative office in city centre. The park focuses on the computer software industry, hosting a number of software companies and schools such as the Saigon Institute of Technology. Established by government decree in June 2000, it officially began operations on 16 March 2001. The initial idea for the park was the brainchild of Nguyễn Thiện Nhân, the Minister of Education, and the design of the park was funded with a grant from the US Trade and Development Agency (USTDA) through the efforts of Pacifica Solutions, LLC, a US-based technology company. The facility was designed through a collaboration of the HCMC Educational Committee, Pacifica Solutions and IndoChina Capital, with assistance from the then-current US Ambassador, Pete Peterson.

== Location ==
Quang Trung Software City is located at the corner of the Quang Trung interchange, an intesection of National Route 1A with Tô Ký Road (part of the former Gia Định Provincial Road 15 starts at Bà Chiểu Market in Bình Hòa area). It also borders a row of houses on the road northeast of the park area that the road is also named as Northeast Road (Đường Đông Bắc).

== History ==
=== Before 1975: Military training center ===
Before 1953, Quang Trung Software City place was empty and is in Quán Tre village, Hóc Môn district, Gia Định province. In 1953, the French built a military training center here for Vietnamese recruits, aiming to supplement the troop supply for their ally, the State of Vietnam, naming it the Quán Tre Training Center. Later, President Ngô Đình Diệm of the Republic of Vietnam renamed it the Quang Trung National Training Center to commemorate the Vietnamese emperor Quang Trung with many glorious military achievements.

=== 1985-1999: Exhibion and convention center ===
After 1975, this area remained a military zone until 1985, occupied and managed by the Gia Định Regiment. At that time, Ho Chi Minh City leader Nguyễn Văn Linh decided to separate a portion of the Quang Trung Training Center to build the Quang Trung Exhibition and Convention Center (Khu Hội chợ Triển lãm Quang Trung), modeled after professional exhibition centers abroad. This was also Vietnam's first professional exhibition center.

In its early days, the place hosted many large trade fairs and exhibitions. "Bấy giờ, Sài Gòn cúp điện như từng bữa ăn, từng giấc ngủ trong nắng nóng, nhưng hàng vạn con người vẫn đạp xe đến xem, và vẫn có những buổi hội thảo bừng lên khát vọng đổi mới" (Back then, power outages in Saigon were as common as meals and sleep in the scorching heat, yet tens of thousands of people still cycled to see the events, and seminars still ignited aspirations for reform).

Following initial successes, the city leaders harbored ambitions to create an integrated industrial and exhibition center. However, the Quang Trung Exhibition Center quickly became inefficient, almost abandoned, and unattractive in the context of the developing open economy. In the late 1990s, city leaders adopted a policy of shifting the city's economic structure towards the development of high value-added industries and services, identifying four key economic sectors: information technology, new materials technology, biotechnology, and automated mechanical engineering.

=== 1999-now: Quang Trung Software City ===
In December 1999, during a meeting with the Ho Chi Minh City Informatics Association, the City Party Secretary Trương Tấn Sang suggested to transform the dilapidated Quang Trung Exhibition Center into a software park. Within a year later, July 7, 2000, Ho Chi Minh City People's Council and People's Committee issued the Decision 4421/QD-UB-CN regarding the construction of Quang Trung Software Park on the foundation of the Quang Trung Exhibition and Convention Center, after visiting several successful software park models in countries such as India, Thailand, Malaysia, etc.

On October 5, 2000, the groundbreaking ceremony for QTSC took place, and five months later, on March 16, 2001, QTSC officially commenced operations.

== Facilities ==
- Data and Backup Center of the Ho Chi Minh City Stock Exchange
- QTSC Museum – Steamzone – Healthcare Center
- QTSC R&D Labs
- Sky Expo Vietnam
- Mina Catering
- Hoa Sen University – Quang Trung Campus
- Viễn Đông College
- Quang Trung Kindergarten
- QTSC Incubator
- QTSC Telecom
- QTSC Building 1
- QTSC Building 6A
- QTSC Building 8
- QTSC Building 9 – Orbital Building
- QTSC Building 10
- Anna Building
- SaigonTech Building
- SMS Tower
- Saigon ICT Tower
- Helios Tower
- Misa Tower
- TMA Tower
- ACB Tower
- JVPE Tower
- Innovation Tower
- Green Hills Serviced Residents
- Villa Đông Phương
- Villa Sài Gòn Liên Phương
