= VN30 Equal Weight Index =

Ho Chi Minh City stock exchange index

VN30 Equal Weight Index tracks the total performance of the top 30 large-cap, liquid stocks listed on the Ho Chi Minh City stock exchange along with two popular indices in Vietnam: VN Index and VN30 Index. All index constituents are equal-weighted to help investors deal with liquidity, foreign ownership and state-owned enterprise constraints when investing in Vietnam.

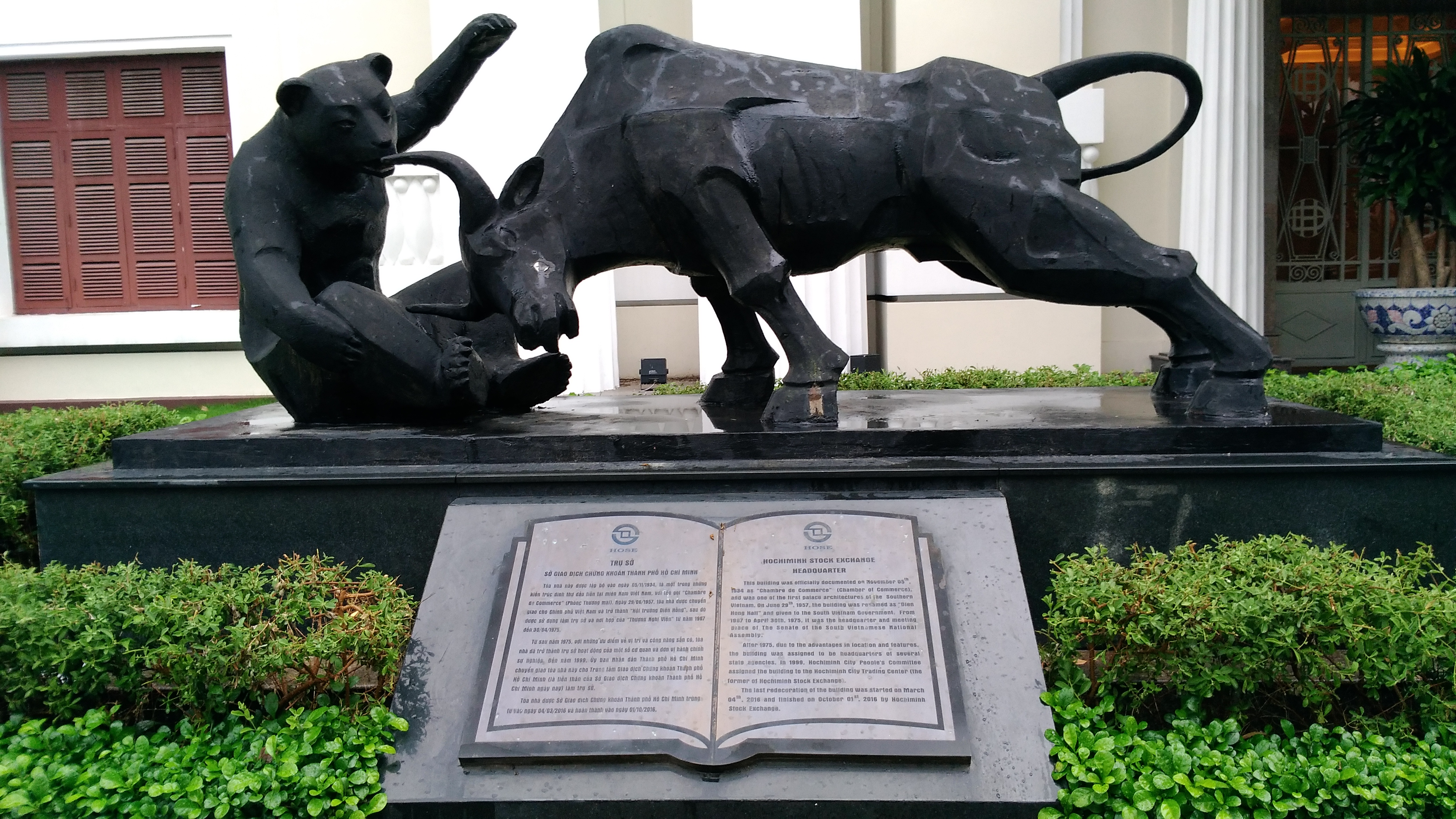
The statue in front of Ho Chi Minh City Stock Exchange headquarters.

The index was developed by Phoenix Global Wealth Management - a division of Phoenix Capital Group - in affiliation with S&P Dow Jones Indices for calculation and update, and officially published on S&P Dow Jones website in late April. This is the first Vietnam-focused index which is affiliated with S&P Dow Jones

== Selection Criteria ==
VN30 Equal Weight Index
- Foundation: February 06, 2012 by Phoenix Global Wealth Management
- Operator: S&P Dow Jones Indices
- Exchanges: Ho Chi Minh Stock Exchange
- Constituents: 30
- Type: Large cap
- Market cap: USD$ 36 billion (as of July 2016)
- Weighting method: Equal-weighted
- Website: customindices.spindices.com

The selection of the constituents in VN30 Equal Weight Index is based on 3 primary criteria: market capitalization, liquidity, and free-float ratio. Further, these stocks must be listed on the Ho Chi Minh Stock Exchange (HOSE). The selected stocks are assigned an equal weight of 1/30. The weight changes during each re-balance period, but the weight allocation will be adjusted after each quarter to maintain the equal weight of 1/30.

The procedure to filter out standard stocks:

Step 1: Stock selection based on market capitalization

- Listed stocks on HOSE are sorted in descending order of market capitalization without free-float adjustment. 50 stocks with the highest market capitalization will be selected.

Step 2: Stock selection based on free-float ratio

- Those stocks with free-float ratio lower than 5% will be omitted.

Step 3: Stock selection based on liquidity

- The remaining stocks selected will be sorted in descending order of a 6-month average value of daily trading volume.
- The stocks that are ranked 20 and above will certainly be selected.
- The stocks that are ranked 41 and below will certainly be omitted.
- The stocks that are ranked between 21 and 40: those stocks that were previously selected in this index will take priority, and then other new stocks will be considered until 30 stocks are selected.

After stock selection, the top 30 stocks will be grouped into the VN30 Equal Weight Index basket, the next 10 stocks will be kept in a backup stock portfolio in case any current stock is omitted.

== Components ==
30 companies listed on Ho Chi Minh Stock Exchange after the selection

== Versions ==
There are 4 versions of the index. These versions differ in how dividends are accounted for, and which currency it is quoted (VND or USD). The price return version does not account for dividends; it only captures the changes in the prices of the index components. The total return version reflects the effects of dividend reinvestment.

- VN30 Equal Weight Price Return VND Index
- VN30 Equal Weight Total Return VND Index
- VN30 Equal Weight Price Return Index
- VN30 Equal Weight Total Return Index

== Weighting ==
The VN30 Equal Weight Index is equal-weighted, not like a traditional capitalization-weighted index; where movements in the prices of stocks with higher market caps (the share price times the number of shares outstanding) have the same impact on the value of the index compared to companies with smaller market caps.

== Index Maintenance ==
The entire index portfolio will be reviewed semi-annually, in January and July. At these times, new constituents will be added and constituents no longer meeting eligibility criteria will be removed. However, on a quarterly basis, the index may undergo a re-weighting, with no composition changes, in order to align constituent weights with index weighting criteria.
