= University of Economics and Law =

University in Ho Chi Minh City, Vietnam

University of Economics and Law, VNU-HCM
- Trường Đại học Kinh tế – Luật, Đại học Quốc gia Thành phố Hồ Chí Minh
- B1 and B2 buildings (featuring Library in two bottom floors of latter one)
- Former names: School of Economics, VNU-HCM
- Motto: Thống nhất – Vượt trội – Tiên phong
- Motto in English: Unity – Excellence – Leadership
- Type: Public
- Established: March 24, 2010; 16 years ago
- Founder: Assoc.Prof.Dr. Nguyễn Văn Luân
- Parent institution: Vietnam National University, Ho Chi Minh City
- Chairman: Assoc.Prof.Dr. Lê Tuấn Lộc
- President: Assoc.Prof.Dr. Hoàng Công Gia Khánh
- Vice-president: Assoc.Prof.Dr. Lê Vũ Nam, Assoc.Prof.Dr. Huỳnh Thị Thuý Giang
- Location: 669 Đỗ Mười, Linh Xuân, Thủ Đức, Ho Chi Minh City, Vietnam
- Campus: 16.3 hectares (40 acres); Suburban
- Language: Vietnamese, English, French
- Website: www.uel.edu.vn
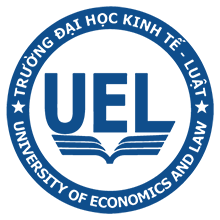

The University of Economics and Law (UEL; Vietnamese: Trường Đại học Kinh tế – Luật, Đại học Quốc gia Thành phố Hồ Chí Minh), or University of Economics and Law, VNU-HCM, is a university in Linh Xuân (Thủ Đức), Ho Chi Minh City, Vietnam. It is a member institution of the Vietnam National University, Ho Chi Minh City (VNU-HCM).

== History ==
Initially established in 2000 and known as Faculty of Economics, VNU-HCM (Khoa Kinh tế) after the split of University of Economics Ho Chi Minh City from the system, it was upgraded as university on March 24, 2010. To be able to meet the demands of socio-economic development in Vietnam as the industrialization, modernization, and global integration of Vietnam are on the rise, the University of Economics and Law has become a leading higher education institution and a center for scientific research and technology transfer of high quality in the fields of economics, law, and management.

== Presidents through period ==
Period	President	Position
2000 - 2009	Assoc.Prof.Dr. Nguyễn Văn Luân	Dean of School
2010 - 2011	Assoc.Prof.Dr. Nguyễn Văn Luân	President
2011 - 2022	Assoc.Prof.Dr. Nguyễn Tiến Dũng	President
2023 - current	Assoc.Prof.Dr. Hoàng Công Gia Khánh	President

== Management Departments ==
Department	Head of Position
Department of Administration	MA. Võ Văn Trọng
Department of Human Resource	Trần Thị Hồng Liên, PhD.
Department of Finance	MA. Lợi Minh Thanh
Academic Affairs Office	Nguyễn Hoàng Dũng, PhD.
Department of Graduate Studies, Technology and Science Research	Assoc.Prof.Dr. Trịnh Quốc Trung
Department of Admission and Student Affairs	MA. Cù Xuân Tiến
Department of Communication	MA. Hoàng Ngọc Hiếu
Office of Academic Quality Assurance	MA. Hoàng Thọ Phú
Department of Cooperation and Development	MA. Lê Văn Hinh
Department of Asset Administration	Trần Thanh Long, PhD.
Department of Information Technology	MA. Trần Thanh Quảng

== Faculties ==
As a competitive university in Vietnam, the University of Economics and Law offers a broad range of courses in business and law, including courses in finance, management, technology and marketing; international law, trade law, and securities law, among many other courses. There is an academically demanding admissions test for the university every year, and it is recognized as one of the most competitive in Vietnam. In terms of their knowledge of foreign languages, students from UEL are expected to be active, well-qualified, and comprehensive when it comes to their knowledge of foreign languages.

In addition to undergraduate programs, the university also offers a wide range of graduate programs. There are several main subjects and majors offered by the university, including:

- The following fields are included in the scope of Economics: Economics, International Economic Relations, Economics and Public Management, Finance and Banking, Accounting, Management Information Systems, Business Administration, International Business, Auditing, Marketing, and Electronic Commerce.
- The following fields are included in the scope of Field of Law: Business Law, International Trade Law, Civil Law and Finance - Banking - Securities Law

List of faculties and other education units of UEL with dean or assigned vice dean of each unit
Faculty / Education Unit	Vietnamese name	Dean / Assigned Vice Dean
Faculty of Economics	Khoa Kinh tế	Assoc.Prof.Dr. Nguyễn Chí Hải
Faculty of International Economic Relations	Khoa Kinh tế đối ngoại	Assoc.Prof.Dr. Huỳnh Thị Thuý Giang
Faculty of Finance and Banking	Khoa Tài chính Ngân hàng	Assoc.Prof.Dr. Nguyễn Anh Phong
Faculty of Accounting and Auditting	Khoa Kế toán Kiểm toán	Hồ Xuân Thuỷ, PhD.
Faculty of Business Administration	Khoa Quản trị Kinh doanh	Trần Thị Hồng Liên, PhD.
Faculty of Information Systems	Khoa Hệ thống Thông tin	Lê Hoành Sử, PhD.
Faculty of Laws	Khoa Luật	Assoc.Prof.Dr. Nguyễn Thị Hồng Nhung
Faculty of Economic Laws	Khoa Luật Kinh tế	Assoc.Prof.Dr. Dương Anh Sơn
Faculty of Economic Maths	Khoa Toán Kinh tế	Phạm Hoàng Uyên, PhD.
International Institute of UEL	Viện Quốc tế UEL	Trần Quang Long, PhD.
Foreign Language Academy	Viện đào tạo ngoại ngữ	Lê Huy Đoàn, PhD. (Assigned Vice Dean)

As a subsidiary of Vietnam National University HCM, the university is a member of AUN, one of the largest education associations in ASEAN, which consists of wide range of universities, colleges and educational institutions.
