= Tân Thới Hiệp =

- Ward
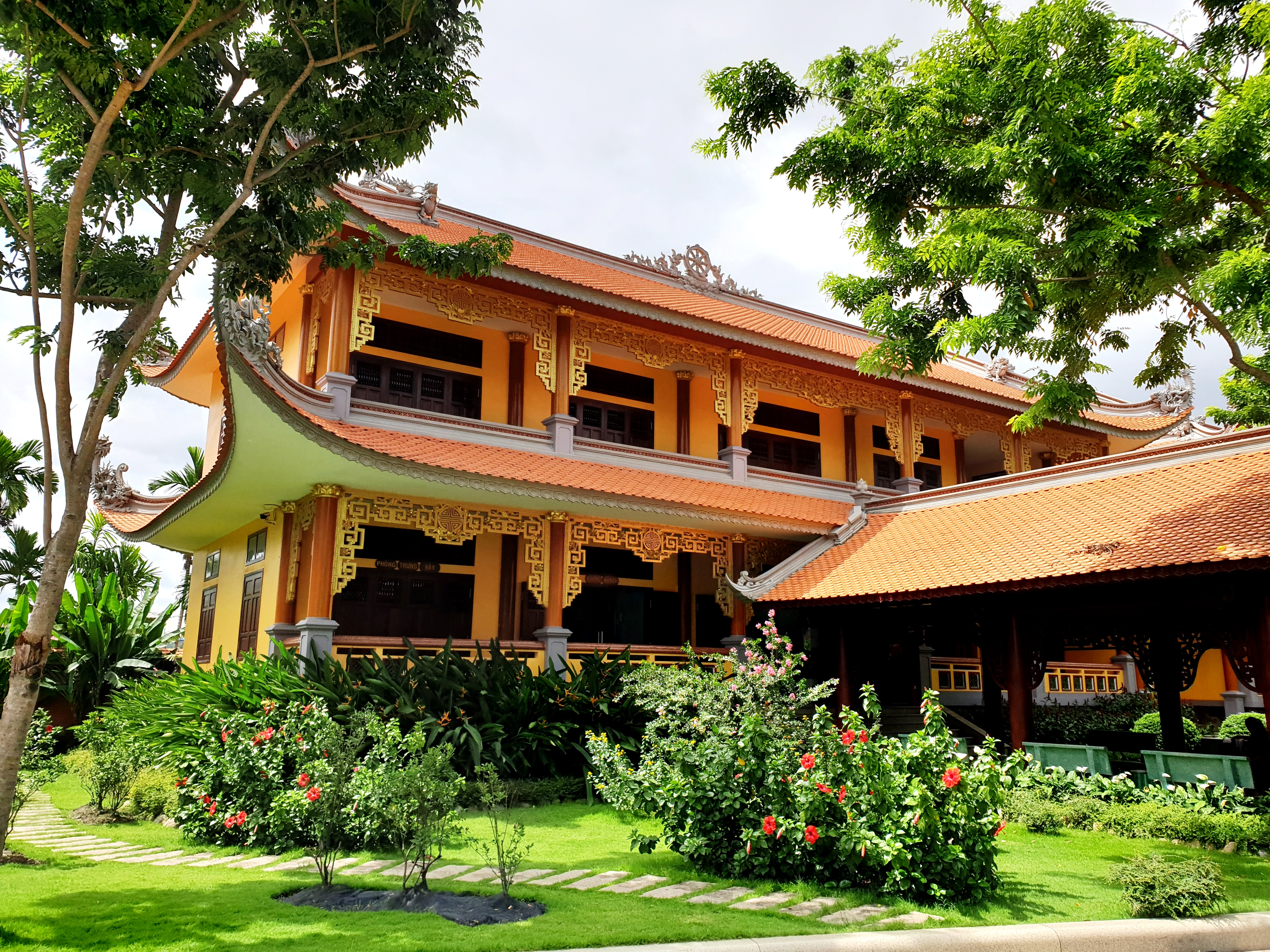
- Vĩnh Nghiêm Buddhist Monastery
- Interactive map of Tân Thới Hiệp
- Coordinates: 10°51′40″N 106°38′26″E
- Country: Vietnam
- Municipality: Ho Chi Minh City
- Established: June 16, 2025

Area
  - Total: 3.11 sq mi (8.06 km^{2})

Population (2024)
  - Total: 168,060
  - Density: 54,000/sq mi (20,900/km^{2})
- Time zone: UTC+07:00 (Indochina Time)
- Administrative code: 26782

Tân Thới Hiệp (Vietnamese: Phường Tân Thới Hiệp) is a ward of Ho Chi Minh City, Vietnam. It is one of the 168 new wards, communes and special zones of the city following the reorganization in 2025.

== History ==
On June 16, 2025, the National Assembly Standing Committee issued Resolution No. 1685/NQ-UBTVQH15 on the arrangement of commune-level administrative units of Ho Chi Minh City in 2025 (effective from June 16, 2025). Accordingly, the entire land area and population of Hiệp Thành and Tân Thới Hiệp wards of the former District 12 will be integrated into a new ward named Tân Thới Hiệp (Clause 34, Article 1).
