= District 12, Ho Chi Minh City =

District 12 Quận 12
- Urban district
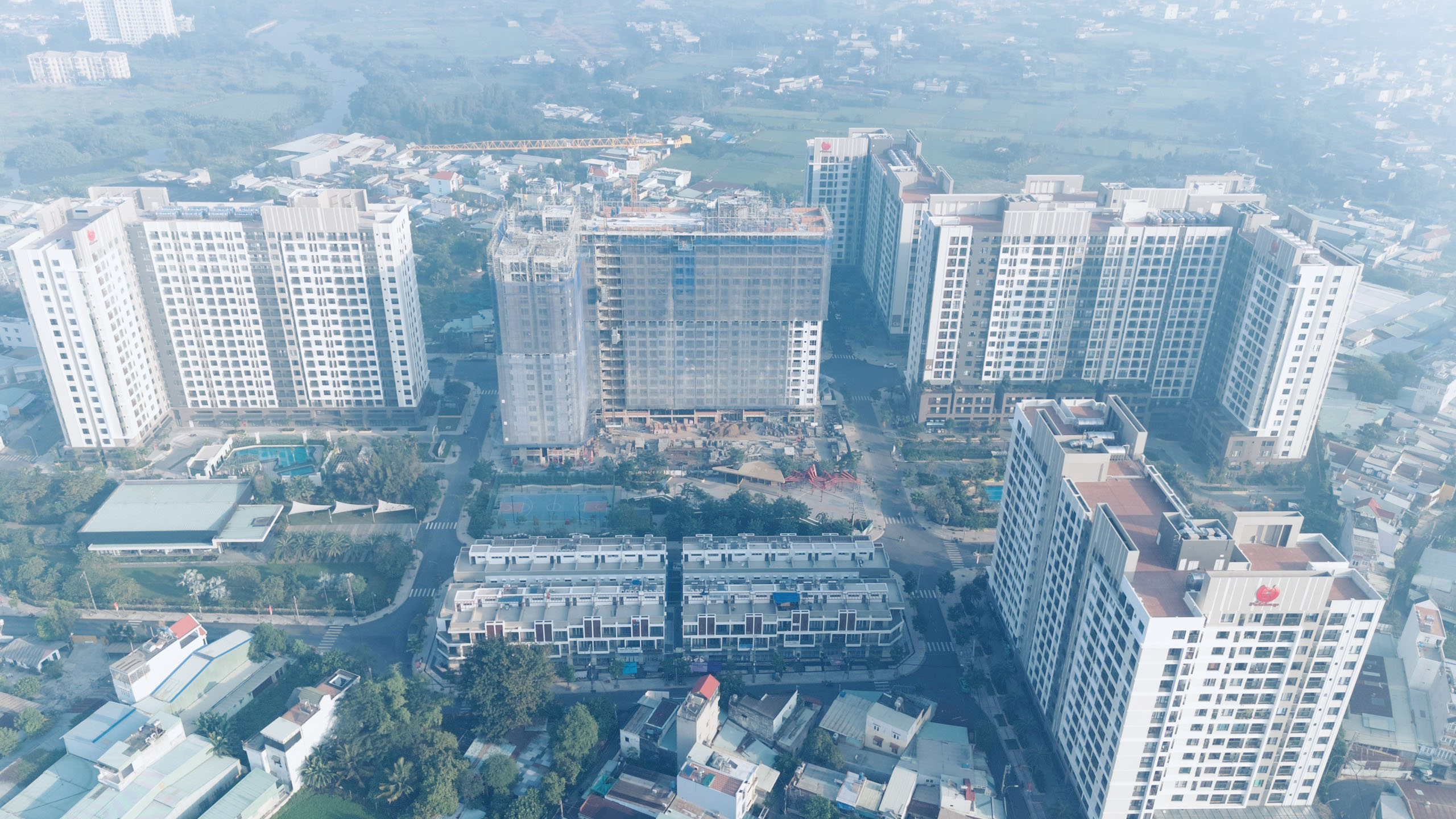
- Aerial view of Picity High Park apartments in Thạnh Xuân ward

- Position in HCMC's core

- Location within Vietnam
- Coordinates: 10°51′43″N 106°39′32″E
- Country: Vietnam
- Centrally governed city: Ho Chi Minh City
- Seat: Administrative center, Thới An ward
- Wards: 11 phường

Area
  - Total: 53 km^{2} (20 sq mi)

Population (2010)
  - Total: 427,083
  - Density: 8,100/km^{2} (21,000/sq mi)

Demographics
  - Main ethnic groups: predominantly Kinh
- Time zone: UTC+07 (ICT)
- Website: quan12.hochiminhcity.gov.vn

District 12 may also refer to a fictional location in The Hunger Games universe, or to other 12th legislative districts.

District 12 (Vietnamese: Quận 12) is an urban district (quận) of Ho Chi Minh City, the largest and third most populous city in Vietnam.

As of 2010, the district had a population of 427,083. The district covers an area of 53.0 km^{2} (20.5 sq mi). The district is divided into 11 small subsets which are called wards.

District 12 borders city of Thuận An, Bình Dương Province and the city of Thủ Đức to the east by Saigon River, Hóc Môn District to the west by National Route 22 and north by Nguyễn Ảnh Thủ street with National Route 1, the districts of Bình Thạnh, Gò Vấp, Tân Bình, Tân Phú and Bình Tân to the south by Tham Lương – Bến Cát – Vàm Thuật River.

== Administration ==
The district consists of 10 wards:

- An Phú Đông
- Đông Hưng Thuận
- Hiệp Thành
- Tân Chánh Hiệp
- Tân Thới Hiệp
- Tân Thới Nhất
- Thạnh Lộc
- Thạnh Xuân
- Thới An
- Trung Mỹ Tây

== Quang Trung Software City ==
The goal of the city is to offer a living and workplace to people who are particularly interested in software development as an economic incentive system to spur the growth of the software industry in Vietnam. It is sponsored by the Japan External Trade Organization and United States Agency for International Development.

The Vietnamese government has arranged for high speed internet to be wired to the area. The city opened in 2001 and housed 20,000 people in 2010.

=== Legal Incentives ===
In order to facilitate use of this resource a number of laws have been set up.

==== Taxes ====
Companies are tax-exempt for their first four years after making a profit, and then only charged 50% of their normal taxes for the next nine years after their exemption. Overall taxes for the area are 10% for the first 15 years of the city, and 25% after that. Imported materials used for software production are import-tax free so long as they can not yet be used domestically. Exported software products are export-tax exempt. A Value Added Tax is also waived for exported software and domestically consumed software.

==== Foreign Workers ====
Special privileges are available to foreigners who are involved in a city project, particularly in getting visas and in buying or renting houses.

=== Cloud Service Provider ===
Another part of the government incentives includes a cloud computing platform for use by local companies.
