= Vietnam National University, Ho Chi Minh City =

Public research university system in Ho Chi Minh City, Vietnam

Vietnam National University Ho Chi Minh City
- Đại học Quốc gia Thành phố Hồ Chí Minh
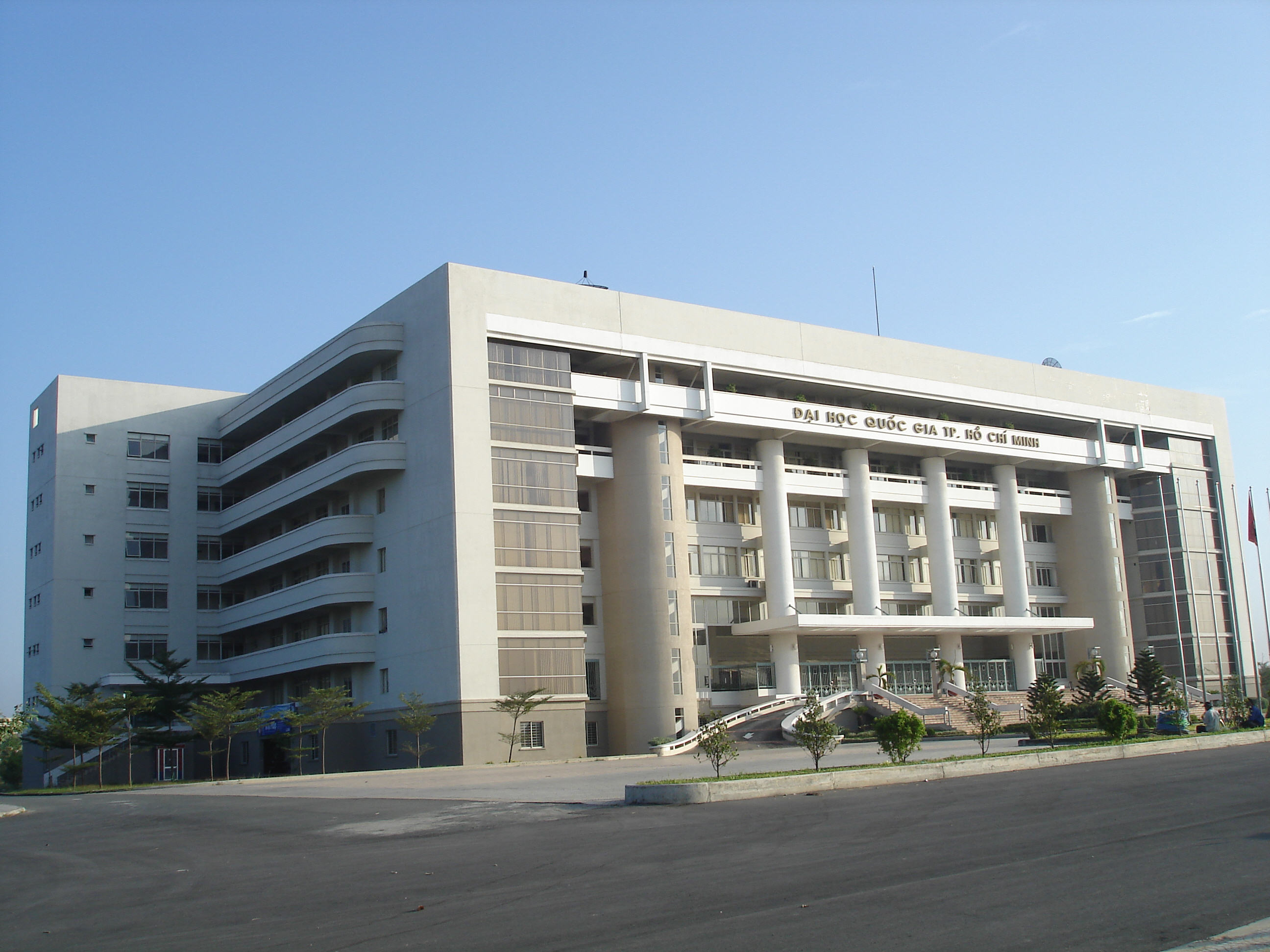
- The Headquarter of Vietnam National University, Ho Chi Minh City
- Type: Public
- Established: January 27, 1995; 31 years ago
- Chancellor: Nguyễn Thị Thanh Mai
- Faculty: 3,809
- Undergraduates: 97,610
- Postgraduates: 7,920
- Doctoral students: 1,173
- Location: Linh Xuân, Đông Hòa, Ho Chi Minh City, 720325, Vietnam; 10°52′07″N 106°47′47″E
- Campus: Suburban, 643.7 hectares
- Language: Vietnamese; English; French; Japanese
- Colors: Dark blue Light blue
- Website: www.vnuhcm.edu.vn

Vietnam National University Ho Chi Minh City (VNUHCM; Vietnamese: Đại học Quốc gia Thành phố Hồ Chí Minh, lit. 'Ho Chi Minh City National University') is a public research university system in Ho Chi Minh City, Vietnam. VNU–HCM is one of two Vietnam's national universities, the other one being Vietnam National University, Hanoi.

Recognized as one of Vietnam's premier higher education institutions, it ranks 2nd in Vietnam according to the Viet Nam's University Rankings (VNUR), 175th in Asia and 850+ in the World according to the QS University Rankings in 2026. In 2020, it was one of the first two Vietnamese universities to be included in the QS Global Ranking of Top 150 universities under 50 years old by 2021.

University rankings

Regional – Overall
- QS Asia: 175 (2026)

Vietnam National University, Ho Chi Minh City is a public higher education institution managed by the Ministry of Education and Training, possessing legal entity status, its own account, and a seal bearing the National Emblem. It operates as a Level-I budget estimation unit, with its budget estimate allocated by the Prime Minister of Vietnam. Vietnam National University, Ho Chi Minh City is responsible for high-quality, multi-disciplinary, and multi-sectoral higher education training, scientific research, and technology transfer, featuring several training fields that lead the country and hold high global rankings.

The university was Founded on 27 January 1995, and reorganized on 12 February 2001, under the Decision no. 15/2001/QĐ-TTg by the Prime Minister of Vietnam Phan Văn Khải. It now provides undergraduate and graduate education, including:

- 147 undergraduate programs
- 123 M.Sc. and M.Eng programs
- 83 doctoral programs

The education professionals cover technology, natural sciences, basic sciences, social sciences and humanities, literature, foreign languages, and business. The headquarters of the university is in Linh Xuân (formerly Linh Trung) and Đông Hòa, northeastern suburb of Ho Chi Minh City.

== History ==
Vietnam National University, Ho Chi Minh City was founded on 27 January 1995 by Government Decree 16/CP on the basis of the merger of nine universities (members): University of Ho Chi Minh City, Thu Duc Technology Training University, Ho Chi Minh City University of Technology, Ho Chi Minh City University of Agriculture and Sylviculture, University of Economics, University of Accounting and Finance, Ho Chi Minh City University of Education (or Ho Chi Minh City Pedagogical University), Ho Chi Minh City Architecture University, branch of Law University of Hanoi into eight members and officially declared on 6 February 1996.

On 12 February 2001, Vietnamese Prime Minister Phan Văn Khải signed a Decision no. 15/2001/QĐ-TTg on the reorganization of this university. According to the decision, Vietnam National University, Ho Chi Minh City, the same applied for Vietnam National University, Hanoi, shall have specific internal organization and activity (unlike the one applicable for other Vietnamese universities), will be given priority to involve in education of postgraduate and science research of spheres of technologies, to be a pioneer in education and science, to contribute significantly to the country's economic and scientific development.

Also in this decision, some member colleges were split from Ho Chi Minh City National University and came under the management of the Ministry of Education.

== Member universities and institute ==
Vietnam National University, Ho Chi Minh City includes the following members:

- Ho Chi Minh City University of Technology
- Ho Chi Minh City University of Science
- Ho Chi Minh City University of Social Sciences and Humanities
- Ho Chi Minh City International University
- Ho Chi Minh City University of Information Technology
- University of Economics and Law
- University of Health Sciences – Vietnam National University, Ho Chi Minh City
- An Giang University
- Institute of Environment and Resources

=== Schools, institutes and branches ===
- VNU-HCM School of Political and Administration Sciences
- VNU-HCM Institute of Environment and Resources
- Branch of VNU-HCM in Bến Tre Province

== Affiliated units ==
- VNU-HCM High School for the Gifted
- John von Neumann Institute
- Institute of University Governance
- International Education Institute
- IC Design Research and Education Center
- Integrated Circuit Research and Education Center
- Institute for Nanotechnology
- Center for Political Science
- Center for Predoctoral Training
- Campus in Ben Tre Province
- Center for National Defense Studies and Student Security
- Central Library
- Publishing House
- Information Technology Park
- Center for Educational Testing and Quality Assessment
- Center of Water Management and Climate Change
- Center for Intellectual Property and Technology Transfer
- Journal of Science and Technology Development
- Center for Dormitory Management
- Center for Investment Promotion and Services
- Center for Campus Management and Development
- Construction Project Management Unit
- Development Foundation
- English Testing Center
- Center for Innovative Materials and Architectures (INOMAR)

== International Rankings ==
By subject area, Vietnam National University, Ho Chi Minh City has multiple subject groups achieving high global rankings. Notable rankings in 2026 include: (According to the QS World University Rankings by Subject 2026)

- Engineering and Technology: Ranked in the Top 351 globally. Notably, Electrical and Electronic Engineering is ranked 351–400, and Petroleum Engineering is ranked 101–150 in the world.
- Computer Science and Information Systems: Ranked in the Top 401–450 globally.
- Mathematics: Ranked 401–450 in the world.
- Natural Sciences: Ranked 401–450 in the world.
- Social Sciences and Management: Ranked 341st in the world.
- Arts and Humanities: Ranked 501–550 in the world.
- Linguistics: Ranked 201–250 in the world.
- Economics and Econometrics: Ranked 351–400. Business and Management Studies: Ranked 451–500 in the world.
- Law and Legal Studies: Ranked 351–400 in the world.

== See also ==
- List of universities in Vietnam
