= Bà Điểm =

Bà Điểm Xã Bà Điểm Tân Thới Nhứt, Mỹ Hòa, Xuân Thới Thượng
- Commune
- Interactive map of Bà Điểm
- Coordinates: 10°50′22″N 106°35′58″E
- Country: Vietnam
- Municipality: Ho Chi Minh City
- Established: June 16, 2025

Area
  - Total: 10.56 sq mi (27.36 km^{2})

Population (2024)
  - Total: 204,289
  - Density: 19,340/sq mi (7,467/km^{2})
- Time zone: UTC+07:00 (Indochina Time)
- Administrative code: 27592

Bà Điểm (Vietnamese: Xã Bà Điểm) is a commune of Ho Chi Minh City, Vietnam. It is one of the 168 new wards, communes and special zones of the city following the reorganization in 2025.

== History ==
On June 16, 2025, the National Assembly Standing Committee issued Resolution No. 1685/NQ-UBTVQH15 on the arrangement of commune-level administrative units of Ho Chi Minh City in 2025 (effective from June 16, 2025). Accordingly, the entire land area and population of Bà Điểm, Trung Chánh and Xuân Thới Thượng communes of the former Hóc Môn district will be integrated into a new commune named Bà Điểm (Clause 133, Article 1).

== Notable people ==
- Phan Văn Hớn (1830–1886), Vietnamese farmer and activist
