= Đông Hưng Thuận =

Đông Hưng Thuận Phường Đông Hưng Thuận Thuận Kiều, Đông Hưng Tân
- Ward
- Interactive map of Đông Hưng Thuận
- Coordinates: 10°50′32″N 106°37′41″E
- Country: Vietnam
- Municipality: Ho Chi Minh City
- Established: June 16, 2025

Area
  - Total: 3.19 sq mi (8.26 km^{2})

Population (2024)
  - Total: 182,895
  - Density: 57,300/sq mi (22,100/km^{2})
- Time zone: UTC+07:00 (Indochina Time)
- Administrative code: 26791

Đông Hưng Thuận (Vietnamese: Phường Đông Hưng Thuận) is a ward of Ho Chi Minh City, Vietnam. It is one of the 168 new wards, communes and special zones of the city following the reorganization in 2025.

== Administration ==
Following the merger on June 16, 2025, Đông Hưng Thuận has 84 neighborhoods numbered from 1 to 84.

== History ==
On June 16, 2025, the National Assembly Standing Committee issued Resolution No. 1685/NQ-UBTVQH15 on the arrangement of commune-level administrative units of Ho Chi Minh City in 2025 (effective from June 16, 2025). Accordingly, the entire land area and population of Tân Thới Nhất, Tân Hưng Thuận and Đông Hưng Thuận wards of the former District 12 will be integrated into a new ward named Đông Hưng Thuận (Clause 32, Article 1).
