= Saigon Technology University =

University in Ho Chi Minh City, Vietnam

Coordinates: 10.7388°N 106.6775°E

- Đại Học Công Nghệ Sài Gòn - STU
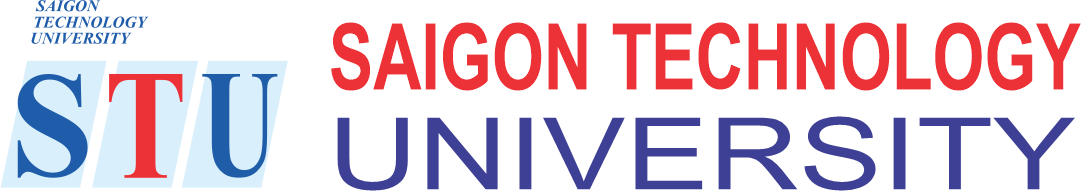
- Motto: Strength-Talent-Young
- Type: Technical University
- Established: 1997
- President: Cao Hào Thi Prof. Dr.
- Address: 180 Cao Lo Street, Ward. 4, Dist. 8, Ho Chi Minh City, Ho Chi Minh City, Vietnam
- Colors: Red and Blue
- Website: www.stu.edu.vn

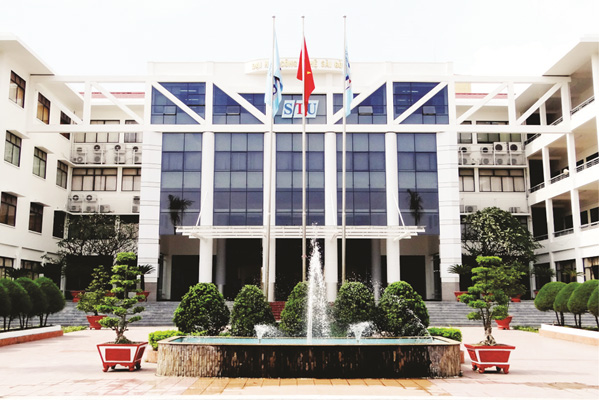
Saigon Technology University

Saigon Technology University (Vietnamese: Đại học Công nghệ Sài Gòn) is a university in Ho Chi Minh City, Vietnam. It was established from the Ho Chi Minh City Technology College, founded on 24 September 1997 by Decision number 198/QĐ-TTg signed by the prime minister of Vietnam. In March 2005, the prime minister signed Decision 52/2005/QĐ-TTg to rename and recognized the upgrading of this college; the name of the university was officially changed. The university provides undergraduate and graduate education and have cooperative education agreements with Troy University from the United States.

== Formation and development of Saigon Technology University (STU) ==
Saigon University of Technology started as Ho Chi Minh City Engineering College (SEC). SEC was set up pursuant to the Decree No. 198/QD-Ttg on 24 September 1997. SEC was the first national college specializing in training disciplines of engineering and technology fields. In April 2004, basing on the training capacity and achievements, the government issued the Decision No 57/2004/QD-Ttg to grant the college to University status, called Ho Chi Minh City Engineering University (SEU).

In March 2005, the university was renamed Saigon Technology University (STU) according to the Decision No 52/2005/QD-Ttg.

Due to the high assessment of STU lecturers and infrastructure, the Ministry of Education and Training allowed the university to start the in-service training system, besides the regular one (based o¬n the Decision No 3410/QD-BGD&DT) and begin a university-level course program (according to the Decision No 7373/QD-BGD&DT, now called successive system into university).

Bachelor’s degrees and diplomas in Engineering at STU are included in the national degree system and are valid nationwide.

At present, STU has the function of training from technical junior level to tertiary one, and implementing applied research in Mechatronics, Telecommunications, Informatics Technology, Industrial Electricity, Automatic Control, Food Technology, Civil Engineering and Business Administration.

== Training process ==
The first college students started their formal studies on 29 December 1997. The school opening ceremony was two months later. The number of the first course students was 800 and the second was 900. Because of local socio-economic development and increased capacity of the school since the beginning of the third course (1999–2000), about 1300-1400 new students are annually recruited. From the academic year of 2004–2005, of the 1400 new students, 50% studied at the university level and 50% at the college level. Since the academic year 2004–2005, the student population has been increasing gradually and there are over 3000 students in school year 2008 - 2009. This raises the student total to about 9,3000.

In early 2006, the university-level completion program started the first course. With good memories of the original university, confidence in the qualifications and dedication of the STU lecturers, over 1000 college engineers, graduating at the junior college level from STU, and 350 degree holders from other colleges eagerly attended the first university-level completion course. After the third semester of “completion”, they will have a university bachelor's degree.

STU has become a comprehensive and flexible training University with its training systems: professional secondary system, traditional university and college system, non-traditional system and university-level completion program.

== Mission ==
Saigon Technology University started on Ho Chi Minh City Engineering College (SEC). SEC was set up with the function of multi-disciplinary training and fields at the levels of junior education, tertiary education, and higher education; providing high quality of human resources having vocation for technology; being good at virtue, education level, foreign languages, and professional knowledge. These could meet the higher and higher socio-economic needs in developing trends of our country, society, and learners.

== Material facilities ==
=== Campus No. 1 (354 Ben Chuong Duong, District 1, Ho Chi Minh City) ===
This first campus is 6.500 m2 wide. The total area of all classrooms, laboratories and workshops is approximate 6000 m2 and their structures are from 1 to 3 floors. Each building has its own large lobby, and the school yard has bonsai and a lot of parterres. This creates comfortable scenery and a good education environment. There are parking areas to for students to protect their vehicles or motorbikes from the rain or sun. The canteen is large and clean with enthusiastic services. The dormitory located inside the school has an annual admission of about 200 students. Actually, STU creates favorable conditions for students to study, research. This university attracts lots of sympathy and support from the students, as well as their relatives and friends.

==== STU building ====
From 1997 to early 2002, the training of STU was mainly conducted at 345 Ben Chuong Duong Street, District 1, Ho Chi Minh City — so-called Building No. 1. Together with strongly comprehensive development, the university put the new building into use in the first semester of the academic year 2002–2003 at Canh Dong Dieu (Kite Field), District 8, Ho Chi Minh City.

=== Campus No. 2 (180 Cao Lo, District 8, Ho Chi Minh City) ===
The university owns a square campus, over 20,000 m2 wide, located on 180 Cao Lo, District 8, near the bridges of Nguyen Tri Phuong, Chanh Hung and Ta Quang Buu Street. The main building, over 22,000 m2 wide, has been built at this location. This new building includes 46 lecture rooms, 44 laboratories, the workshop, the computer center, and the hall and the canteen, etc. The architects paid special attention to a modern building construction, having appearance of a technical university with harmonious colors and cubes.

This building features plenty of trees, parterres, and artificial waterfalls. The front and inside yards are large and quiet, which are taken care of like a small park, creating a quiet environment for students loving study and research. The university provides land-based and wireless Internet connections for students to access the Internet easily in the university lobby.

Behind the building, there is a multi-function playground and a football ground. Near the football ground is going to be a new student dormitory with about 500 living quarters .

==== Classrooms and laboratories ====
Both of the two buildings include 46 classrooms, covering an area of 11,000 m2. The classrooms are high, light and cool and have good acoustics.

The university has made great efforts in supplying equipment to ensure its “technology specialization”. Except for the Faculty of Business Administration, using the laboratory and informatics software as the main scientific materials, each of the other Faculties has its own laboratory, workshop or specialist computer room. STU has the following laboratories and workshops:

- General physics laboratory;
- General chemistry laboratory;
- Digital circuits laboratory;
- Microcomputer Laboratory;
- Electronic circuits Laboratory;
- Electric circuit Laboratory;
- Applied electronics Laboratory;
- Telecommunication Laboratory;
- Optical fiber communication;
- Automatic control Laboratory;
- Electricity Workshops;
- Basic electricity Workshop;
- Technical electricity Workshop;
- Basic cold Workshop;
- Mechanic measurement Workshop;
- Welding Workshop;
- Mechanic transmission Workshop;
- Civil Engineering Laboratory;
- Computer room for specialized construction;
- Geodesy equipment room;
- Chemist Food Laboratory;
- Food microbiologist Laboratory;
- Perceptible Laboratory;
- Computer hardware Laboratory;
- Computer center with nearly 300 networking computers, land based and wireless internet ADSL;
- Fashion design Studio;
- Fine Art Studio;
- Mock Model Workshop;
- Graphic and Photography Studio.

== Faculties ==
- Faculty of Information Technology (Khoa Công nghệ Thông tin)
- Faculty of Food Processing (Khoa Công nghệ Thực phẩm)
- Faculty of Mechanics (Khoa Cơ khí)
- Faculty of Electronics and Electricity (Khoa Điện-Điện tử)
- Faculty of Engineering (Khoa Kỹ thuật Công trình)
- Faculty of Business Administration (Khoa Quản trị Kinh doanh)
- Faculty of Design (Khoa Design)
- Faculty of in-service Education (Khoa Ngoài chính quy)
