= Ho Chi Minh City University of Science =

Public college in Ho Chi Minh City, Vietnam

VNUHCM-University of Science
- Trường Đại học Khoa học tự nhiên, Đại học Quốc gia Thành phố Hồ Chí Minh
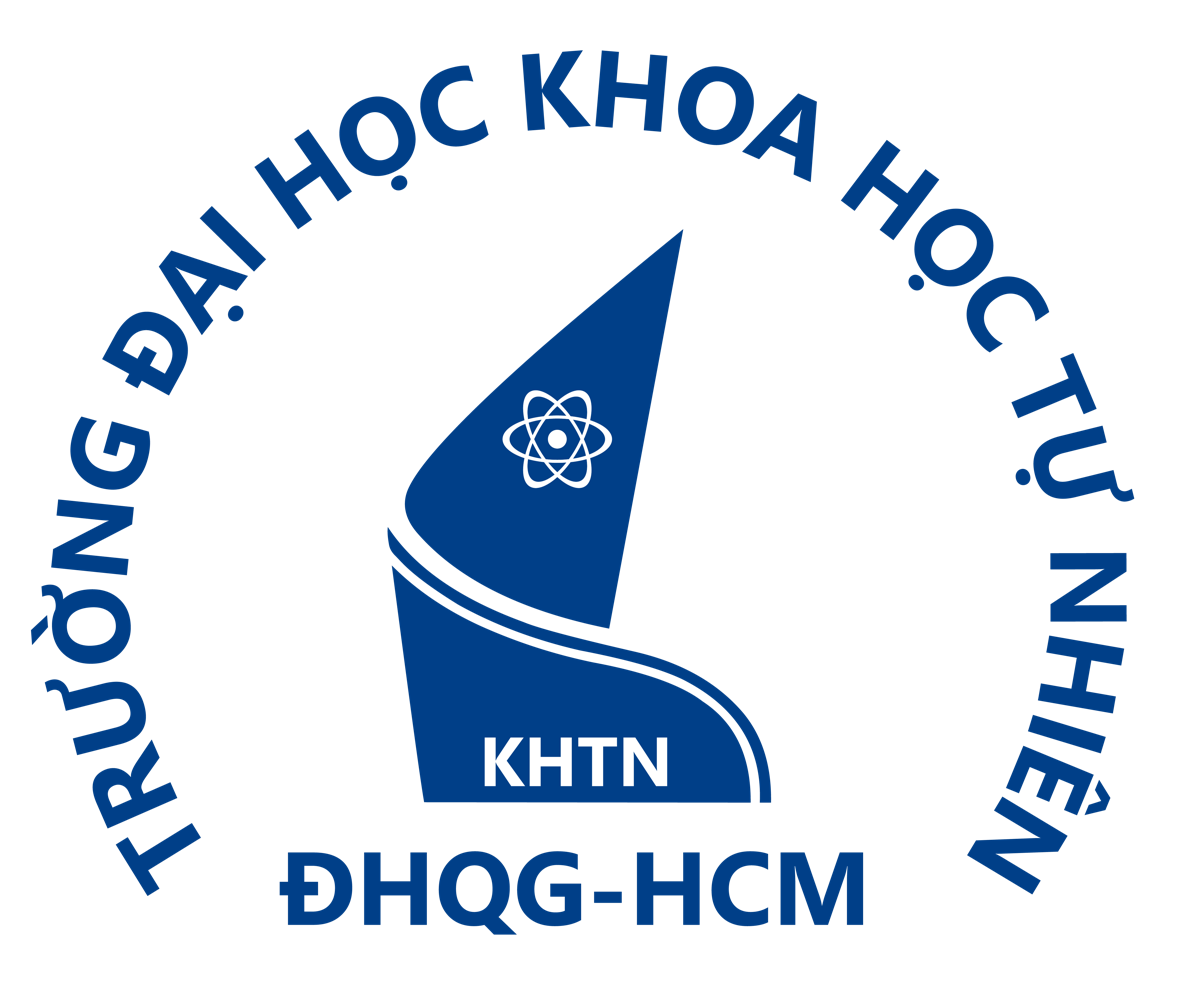
- Former names: University of Science, Viet Nam National University Ho Chi Minh City
- Type: Public, research university
- Established: July 26, 1941; 84 years ago
- Parent institution: Vietnam National University, Ho Chi Minh City
- President: Assoc. Prof. Trần Lê Quan
- Vice-president: Prof. Nguyễn Trung Nhân, Assoc. Prof. Trần Minh Triết, MSc. Văn Chí Nam
- Academic staff: ~1100
- Administrative staff: ~350
- Location: 227 Nguyen Van Cu St., Cho Quan Ward, Ho Chi Minh City, Vietnam; 10°45′46″N 106°40′53″E
- Campus: 84 acres (34 ha); Urban
- Website: www.hcmus.edu.vn

University of Science, Viet Nam National University Ho Chi Minh City (HCMUS; Vietnamese: Trường Đại học Khoa học tự nhiên, Đại học Quốc gia Thành phố Hồ Chí Minh, lit. 'University of Natural Science, Ho Chi Minh City National University'), or VNU-HCM University of Science, offers scientific degrees in Ho Chi Minh City, Vietnam. It was established in 1941 as the Indochina College of Science.

== History and development ==
HCMUS was re-founded in March 1996 following a split from Đại học Tổng hợp (Ho Chi Minh City University). The university became a member of Vietnam National University, Ho Chi Minh City (VNUHCM). Following internal reforms in 1996, the Faculty of Science became the University of Sciences, one of five affiliated universities under VNUHCM.

In 2007, it was renamed the University of Science, marking a new phase in its role within the VNUHCM system and focusing on public education and research.

== Programs and enrollment ==
As of July 2025, HCMUS has more than 20,000 overall student enrollment undergraduates and postgraduates

Their joint bachelor programs are in collaboration with:

- Auckland University of Technology, New Zealand (Bachelor of Computer & Information Sciences with a major in IT Service Science)
- Keuka College, USA (Bachelor of Science in Management with a major in International Business).

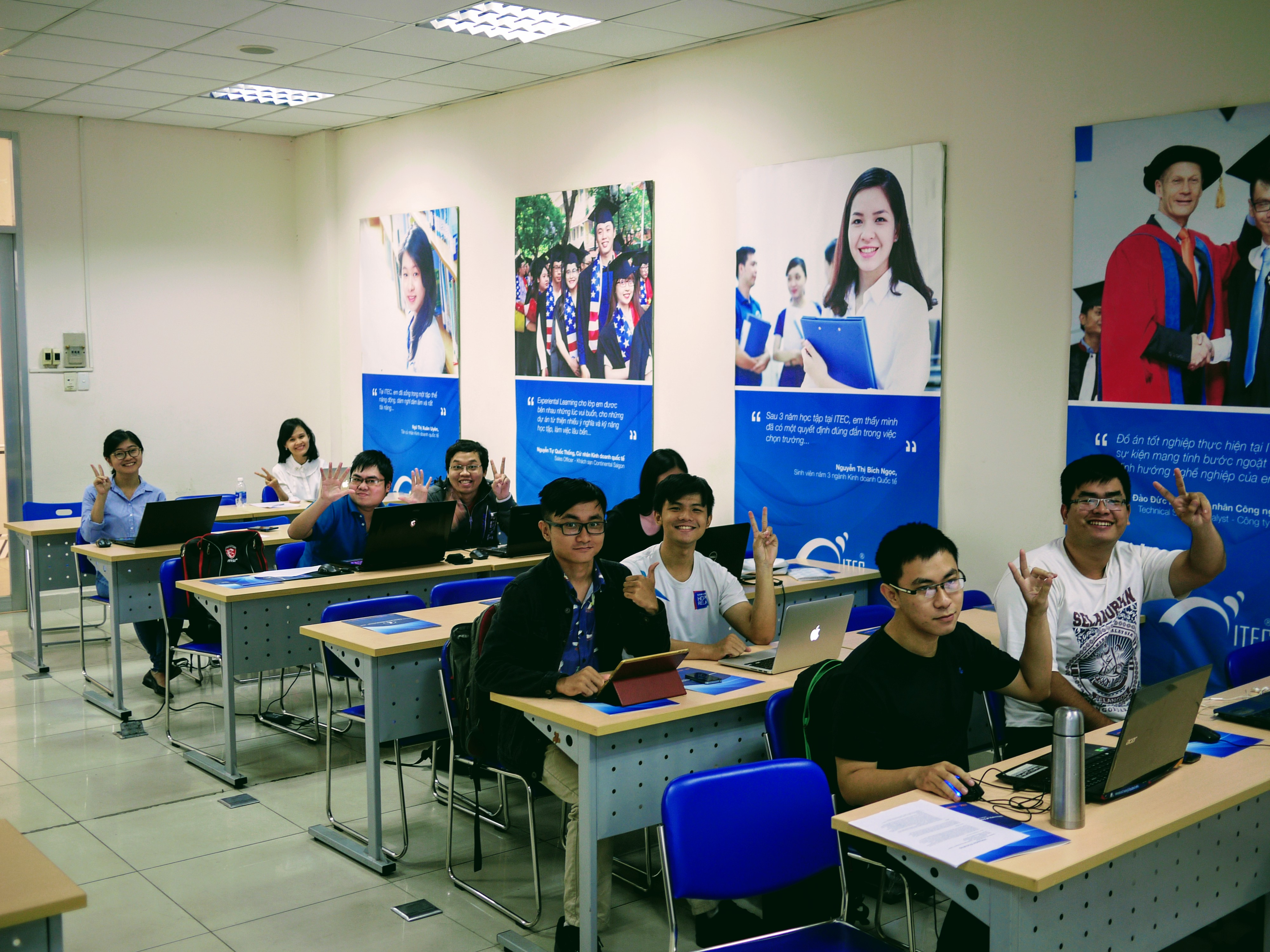
Wikipedia Workshop with ITEC students at the Ho Chi Minh University of Science, District 5 campus.

== Campuses ==
- 227 Nguyen Van Cu Street, Cho Quan Ward, Ho Chi Minh City.
- Dong Hoa Ward Ho Chi Minh City.
- Viet Nam National University Ho Chi Minh City (VNU-HCM) is one of the top public universities in Ho Chi Minh City, Vietnam. It is ranked #901-950 in QS World University Rankings 2025.

== Faculties ==
| STT | Name | Official website |
|---|---|---|
| 1 | Faculty of Mathematics and Computer Science | https://www.math.hcmus.edu.vn/ |
| 2 | Faculty of Information Technology | https://www.fit.hcmus.edu.vn/ |
| 3 | Faculty of Physics and Engineering Physics | https://phys.hcmus.edu.vn/ |
| 4 | Faculty of Electronics and Telecommunications | http://www.fetel.hcmus.edu.vn/ |
| 5 | Faculty of Chemistry | http://www.chemistry.hcmus.edu.vn/ |
| 6 | Faculty of Biology and Biotechnology | https://fbb.hcmus.edu.vn/vn/trang-chu.html |
| 7 | Faculty of Geology | https://geology.hcmus.edu.vn/ |
| 8 | Faculty of Environment | http://www.environment.hcmus.edu.vn/ |
| 9 | Faculty of Materials Science and Technology | http://www.mst.hcmus.edu.vn/ |
| 10 | Faculty of Interdisciplinary Sciences | https://fis.hcmus.edu.vn/ |

== Honor Program ==
The Honor Program at Vietnam National University, Ho Chi Minh City, aims to train students to be well-versed in the fields of research and advanced technologies. Students in this program must complete a thesis for graduation.

== See also ==
- List of universities in Vietnam
- Vietnam National University, Ho Chi Minh City
