= Ho Chi Minh City University of Agriculture and Forestry =

University in Thủ Đức, Ho Chi Minh City, Vietnam

Coordinates: 10.8713°N 106.7917°E

- Trường Đại học Nông Lâm TP.HCM
- Other names: Nong Lam University
- Type: Public
- Established: 1955
- Rector: Assoc.Prof.Dr. Nguyễn Tất Toàn
- Location: Block 33, Linh Xuân ward, HCMC, Vietnam
- Website: www.hcmuaf.edu.vn

Ho Chi Minh City University of Agriculture and Forestry (HCMUAF) (Vietnamese: Trường Đại học Nông Lâm Thành Phố Hồ Chí Minh), commonly known as Nong Lam University (NLU), is a comprehensive university in Linh Xuân ward, Ho Chi Minh City, Vietnam. The university offers 46 majors, such as: Agronomy, Agricultural Engineering, Forestry, Animal Sciences Fisheries, Food Technology, Environmental Science, Foreign Languages, Biological Technology, Economics, and IT, providing both graduate and postgraduate programs.

== Faculties ==
- Faculty of Agriculture
- Faculty of Veterinary Breeding
- Faculty of Forestry
- Faculty of Economics
- Faculty of Engineering and Technology
- Faculty of Fishery
- Faculty of Food Technology
- Faculty of Sciences
- Faculty of Foreign Languages
- Faculty of Environment Technology
- Faculty of Information Technology
- Faculty of Land and Real Estate
- Faculty of Biological Sciences

== Departments ==
- Department of Politics
- Department of Chemistry Technology
- Department of BioTechnology
- Department of Technical Education
