= Saigon Institute of Information Technology =

Saigon Institute of Technology (Saigon Tech, Vietnamese: Trường Cao Đẳng Nghề Sài Gòn) is a university in Ho Chi Minh City, Vietnam specializing in information technology.

The technology university opened in 2001.
