= Linh Xuân =

Linh Xuân Phường Linh Xuân Linh Trung, Xuân Vinh, Xuân Trường
- Ward
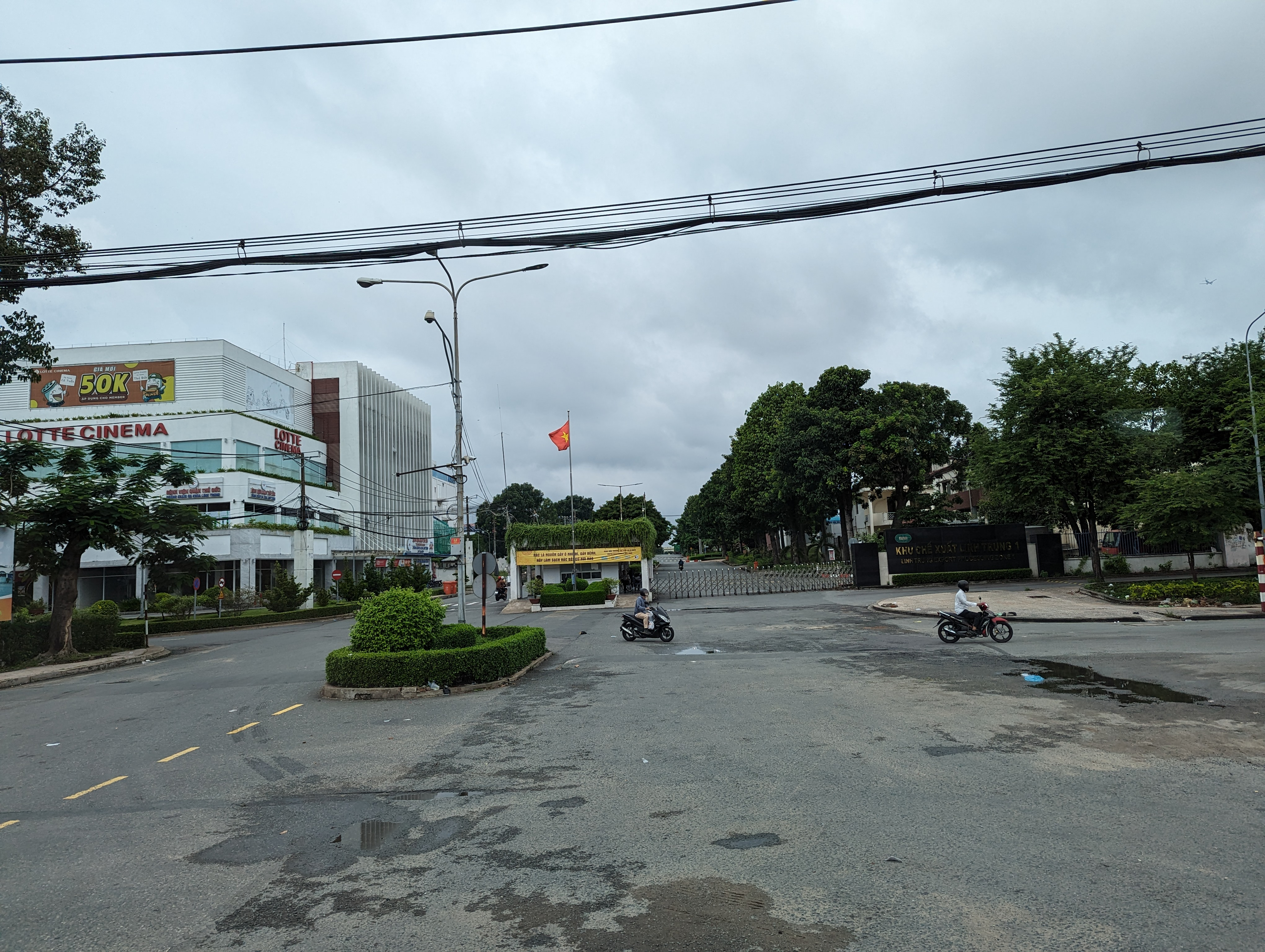
- Linh Trung Export Processing Zone
- Interactive map of Linh Xuân
- Coordinates: 10°52′57″N 106°46′10″E
- Country: Vietnam
- Municipality: Ho Chi Minh City
- Established: June 16, 2025

Area
  - Total: 4.75 sq mi (12.29 km^{2})

Population (2024)
  - Total: 158,334
  - Density: 33,370/sq mi (12,880/km^{2})
- Time zone: UTC+07:00 (Indochina Time)
- Administrative code: 26800

Linh Xuân (Vietnamese: Phường Linh Xuân) is a ward of Ho Chi Minh City, Vietnam. It is one of the 168 new wards, communes and special zones of the city following the reorganization in 2025.

== History ==
On June 16, 2025, the National Assembly Standing Committee issued Resolution No. 1685/NQ-UBTVQH15 on the arrangement of commune-level administrative units of Ho Chi Minh City in 2025 (effective from June 16, 2025). Accordingly, the entire land area and population of Linh Trung, Linh Xuân wards and the majority of Linh Tây ward of the former Thủ Đức city will be integrated into a new ward named Linh Xuân (Clause 70, Article 1).
