= Rach Chiec National Sports Complex =

Complex in Ho Chi Minh City, Vietnam

Coordinates: 10.8092°N 106.7591°E

Rạch Chiếc National Sports Complex
- Khu Liên hợp Thể dục thể thao Quốc gia Rạch Chiếc
- Rạch Chiếc Stadium
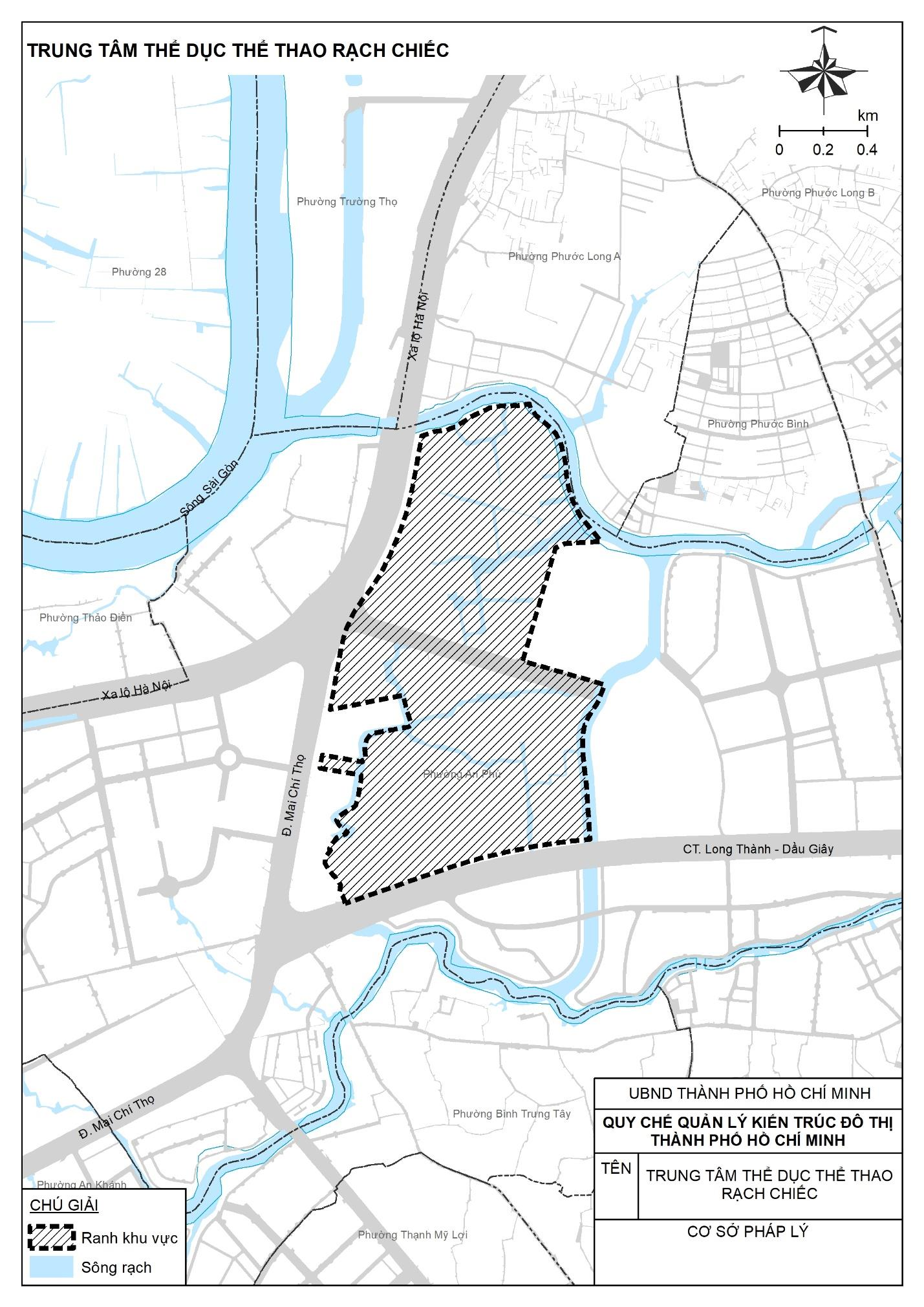
- 2022 governmental projection of Rạch Chiếc sports complex. The subdivisions portrayed on the map may have become obsolete following the 2025 Vietnamese administrative reform, but the designated area remains relevant.
- Address: Bình Trưng, Ho Chi Minh City; Vietnam
- Owner: HCMC People's Committee
- Type: Sports complex
- Field size: 186.78 hectares (461.5 acres)
- Public transit: L1 L5 Rach Chiec station; L2 L10 Thủ Thiêm station (North–South Express Railway, Thủ Thiêm–Long Thành Light Rail)

Construction
- Groundbreaking: January 15, 2026
- Opened: 2031-2034
- Cost: US$5.2 billion
- Architect: Populous Holdings
- Main contractor: Sun Vung Tau

Website
- Sun Group; Populous

Rach Chiec National Sports Complex (Vietnamese: Khu liên hợp thể dục thể thao quốc gia Rạch Chiếc) is an under construction sports complex in Bình Trưng (formerly An Phú, Thủ Đức), Ho Chi Minh City, Vietnam.

== History ==
=== Struggled initiation ===
In 1994, the project was approved to be built on 466 hectares (1,150 acres) in An Phú ward along Hanoi Highway in the former District 2 then the City of Thủ Đức. It has since been scaled down to 212 hectares (520 acres). As of 2024, the project's land remains a swamp with ponds for fishing and aquaculture.

Construction was slated to begin in 2017, but the plan was never materialized until the 2025 reboot.

On 15 October 2024, Ho Chi Minh City announced it was seeking VND 25 trillion for 23 sports and cultural projects, including 16 projected facilities within the Rach Chiec National Sports Complex worth VND 21 trillion. These included a 3,500 seat velodrome, a 50,000-seat stadium, and a 6,000-seat arena.

=== Sun Group's engagement and groundbreaking ===
In early 2026, the local government officially approved the master plan, constituting a central 65,000-75,000-seat stadium and associated facilities. Sun Group was eventually appointed as the investor under a build-transfer (BT) arrangement.

Construction on this project officially commenced in January 2026. Populous has been assigned as the principle master-planner and designer for the project. All development and construction should be done in 8 years since the early-2026 contract activation, with relevant parties hoped to complete the entire complex after 5 years.

== Facilities ==
=== Sport venues ===
- Rạch Chiếc Stadium: 70,000 seats
- Multi-purpose Competitive arena and Performance Arena: 18,000 seats
- Multi-purpose sports center: 5,000–10,000 seats
- Aquatic centre will host swimming, diving, and water polo
- Tennis center
- Fitness and recreation centre, along with auxiliary courts

=== Other buildings ===
The other buildings yet to have any information, except:

- Conference centre: 10,000 seats

== Accessibility and transportation ==
Rach Chiec National Sports Complex is accessible by vehicles via Mai Chí Thọ Boulevard and Thủ Thiêm Tunnel (East–West Highway) from the west side of Saigon River, Ho Chi Minh City–Long Thanh–Dau Giay Expressway from the east side of the complex and Hanoi Highway for the northeastern like Bình Dương area or Đồng Nai.

There are 2 metro stations nearby the complex are the Rach Chiec station on Ho Chi Minh City Metro Line 1, an east-west metro railway, connect the downtown at Ben Thanh station with the eastern and western area of HCMC; it is also on the Inner Ring Line, numbered as Line 5. And the other is Thủ Thiêm station, where Line 2 will run through that also connect to downtown by Ben Thanh station, but will turn to the northwest area of the city like former districts of Tân Bình, Tân Phú, Hóc Môn, Củ Chi, etc; the station is also on the Outer Ring Line, numbered as Line 10.
