= Tân Bình Gymnasium =

Sports venue in Ho Chi Minh City, Vietnam

- Trung Tâm Văn hóa Thể thao Tân Bình, Nhà Thi đấu Tân Bình
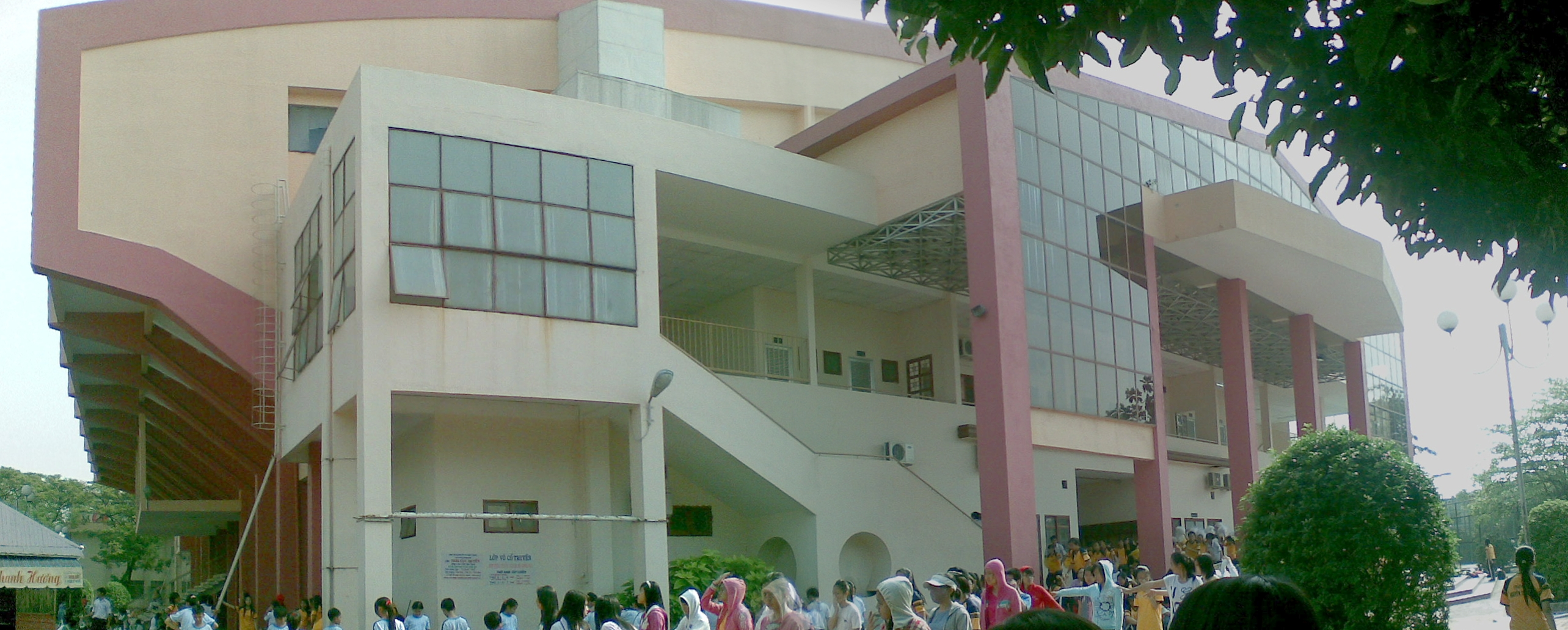
- Interactive map of Tân Bình Gymnasium
- Full name: Tân Bình Cultural and Sports Center
- Address: 448 Hoàng Văn Thụ Road (Gate 1) and 18 Xuân Hồng Street (Gate 2), Tân Sơn Nhất, Ho Chi Minh City; Vietnam
- Location: Bảy Hiền Intersection, Tân Bình District
- Operator: Tân Bình Cultural and Sports Center
- Capacity: 2,068
- Public transit: L2 L5 Bảy Hiền station (under construction)

Construction
- Opened: February 1997

Tenants
- Saigon Heat (2012-2013); Cantho Catfish (2022-present)

Website
- trungtamvanhoathethaotanbinh.com

Tân Bình Gymnasium or officially known as Tân Bình Cultural and Sports Center (Vietnamese: Trung Tâm Văn hóa Thể thao Tân Bình, Nhà Thi đấu Tân Bình) is an indoor sports arena, located in Ho Chi Minh City, Vietnam. The arena opened in February 1997 with a capacity of 2,000 seats.

== History ==
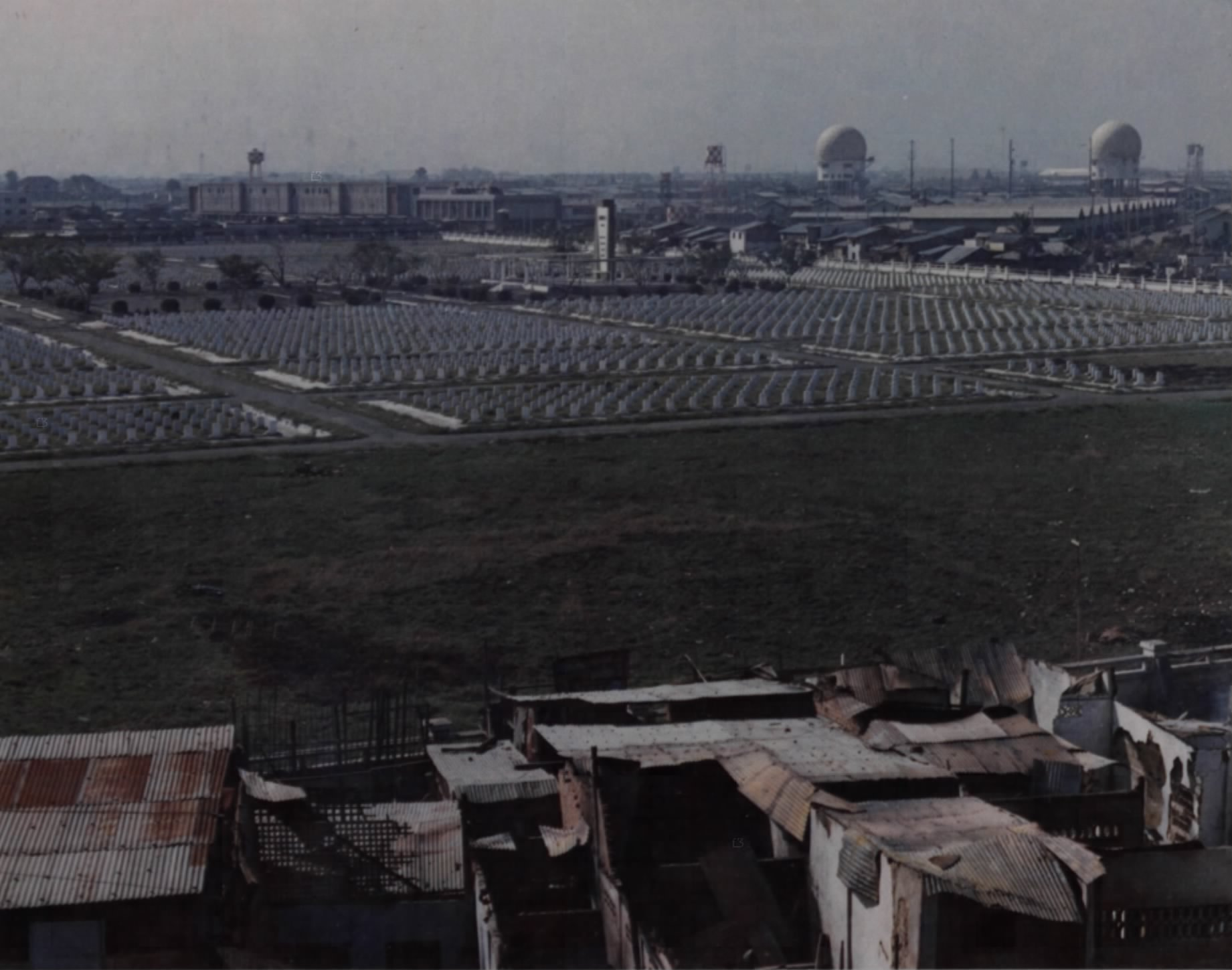
French Military Cemetery, Saigon, May 1968

Before 1986, the gymnasium with the Tân Bình Exhibition & Convention Center (TBECC; Trung Tâm Hội Chợ và Triển Lãm Tân Bình) was the place of French Military Cemetery, Saigon that lied in the south of Tân Sơn Nhứt Air Base. In August 1986, Franco-Vietnamese agreements provided for the repatriation to France of 27,000 bodies of French soldiers and civilians from the Saigon cemetery, Vũng Tàu cemetery and Ba Huyền cemetery near Hanoi. All remains were exhumed and repatriated between 1986 and 1987 and later reinterred at the Mémorial des guerres en Indochine in Fréjus, France. Since that, the TBECC and the gymnasium were built and officially opened in February 1997.

During the COVID-19 pandemic in Ho Chi Minh City, this site was used as a field hospital.

== Usage ==
Tân Bình Gymnasium was the venue for Badminton events at the 2003 Southeast Asian Games. In 2009, it was used as the main venue for 2009 Asian Indoor Games' women's futsal matches.

Saigon Heat, Vietnam's first professional basketball team, named Tân Bình Gymnasium as their home court when the team joined the ASEAN Basketball League in 2012. Saigon Heat moved their home court to CIS Arena (Canadian International School Vietnam) in 2014.

Tân Bình Gymnasium played host for the ABL's first ever Hoops Fest, an annual mid-season showcase of the league, which was held 15 March 2013 to 17 March 2013.

=== Musical events ===
- May 31, 2025: EXID – FANCON Tour (2024–2025)
- August 2025: Tân Binh Toàn Năng – Live Stage 1 (Pre-recorded show)
- April 18, 2026: Jessica Jung – Reflections Tour

== Transportation ==
The gymnasium is just 3 to 5 km away from the Tan Son Nhat International Airport (all terminals). The area including the gymnasium itself with the TBECC is considered as the Transit-oriented development (TOD) for the under construction Bảy Hiền station, it will be an interchange Line 2 with Line 5, especially the Line 2 will connect the gymnasium with the city old downtown and new downtown, and as the line will be end at the future Thủ Thiêm Station, which is also on the Thủ Thiêm–Long Thành Light Rail, the venue will also be connected with the Long Thanh International Airport.

== See also ==
- Phú Thọ Indoor Stadium
- Hanoi Indoor Games Gymnasium
