= Line 2 (Ho Chi Minh City Metro) =

Under construction rapid transit line in Ho Chi Minh City, Vietnam

- L2

Overview
- Native name: Tuyến 2
- Status: Under construction
- Owner: Ho Chi Minh City
- Locale: Ho Chi Minh City, Vietnam
- Termini: Ben Thanh; Tân Bình
- Stations: 17 (under construction); 61 (planned)

Service
- Type: Rapid transit
- System: Ho Chi Minh City Metro
- Operator: Management Authority of Urban Railways in Ho Chi Minh City (MAUR)
- Depot: Tham Lương
- Rolling stock: Hyundai Rotem, 3 cars per train set

History
- Planned opening: 2030 - 2032 (planned)

Technical
- Line length: 17.5 kilometers (10.9 mi) (under construction); 62.2 kilometers (38.6 mi) (planned)
- Num of tracks: 2
- Track gauge: 1,435 mm (4 ft 8 1/2 in) standard gauge
- Electrification: 1,500 V DC from overhead catenary
- Operating speed: 35 km/h (22 mph); 80 km/h (50 mph) (maximum)

Line 2 of the Ho Chi Minh City Metro (Vietnamese: Tuyến số 2 của hệ thống đường sắt đô thị Thành phố Hồ Chí Minh) is an under construction rapid transit line in Ho Chi Minh City, Vietnam. Line 2 is the city's second metro line, and will connect the former District 1 with District 2 to the east and District 12 and more further is Hóc Môn and Củ Chi to the northwest. The construction's phase 1, known as Bến Thành – Tham Lương began in January 2026; and phase 2, known as Bến Thành – Thủ Thiêm began three months after, with an expected completion date for both phases in 2030. The phase 1 length is 11.3-kilometer (7.0 mi) long with eleven stations and phase 2 is 6.2-kilometer (3.9 mi) six stations.

The loan was to be provided by the Asian Development Bank (ADB), the German Development Bank (KfW), and the European Investment Bank (EIB). The project's total cost is VND47,900 billion (US$2.04 billion). However, they later decided that the state budget would fund the project instead.

== Route ==
The metro western branch line, including Phase 1 starts at Ben Thanh station in Bến Thành, District 1, passes through Phạm Hồng Thái, Cách Mạng Tháng Tám, and Trường Chinh streets underground, and elevated at Tân Bình station at before turn left to ends at Tham Lương depot in District 12. And for phase 3, from the Tân Bình station in Tân Bình district, the metro line continue to passes through National Route 22 in Hóc Môn, Củ Chi and ends at the border of the city with Tây Ninh province, all the stations and line of the phase are elevated. Both phases go to the northwest.

The eastern branch of the metro is the line Phase 2, starts at Ben Thanh station, passes underground of Hàm Nghi Boulevard and the Saigon River by a tunnel that parallel to the Saigon River Tunnel and continue to crosses the Mai Chí Thọ Boulevard then end at Thủ Thiêm station next to the An Phú intersection and the Rach Chiec National Sports Complex

== Construction ==
The project comprises seven construction packages.

- CP0 package: Relocation of technical infrastructure system
- CP1 package: The official building and auxiliary works at Tham Lương depot.
- CP2 package: Infrastructure at Tham Lương depot.
- CP3 package (including CP3a and CP3b): Tunnels and Underground stations.
- CP4 package: Transition Structure, Viaduct and Elevated Station.
- CP5 package: E&M system.
- CP6 package: Track work.
- CP7 package: Non-System E&M.

== Stations ==
Station number		Station name		Layout	Transfers	Location	
Total	Current phase	English name	Vietnamese name	Layout	Transfers	Ward (current name after 2025 reform)	Former district-level
1	—N/a	Thủ Thiêm		Underground	North–South Express (planned); Thủ Thiêm–Long Thành Light Rail (planned); L10 (planned)	An Phú (Bình Trưng)	Thủ Đức
2	—N/a	Bình Khánh		Underground		An Khánh	Thủ Đức
3	—N/a	International Hospital	Bệnh viện Quốc tế	Underground		An Lợi Đông (An Khánh)	Thủ Đức
4	—N/a	Young Pioneer Palace	Cung Thiếu nhi	Underground		Thủ Thiêm (An Khánh)	Thủ Đức
5	—N/a	Tố Hữu		Underground	L7 (planned)	Thủ Thiêm (An Khánh)	Thủ Đức
6	—N/a	Hàm Nghi		Underground		Bến Nghé (Saigon)	District 1
7	1	Ben Thanh		Underground	L1; L4 (planned); L12 (planned)	Bến Thành	District 1
8	2	Tao Đàn		Underground	L3 (planned)	Bến Thành	District 1
9	3	Dân Chủ		Underground	L8 (planned)	Xuân Hòa	District 3, District 10
10	4	Hòa Hưng		Underground	North–South Railway; L8 (planned); L9 (planned)	Nhiêu Lộc, Hòa Hưng	District 3, District 10
11	5	Lê Thị Riêng		Underground		Nhiêu Lộc, Hòa Hưng	District 3, District 10
12	6	Phạm Văn Hai		Underground		Tân Sơn Nhất, Tân Hòa, Bảy Hiền	Tân Bình
13	7	Bảy Hiền		Underground	L5 (planned)	Tân Sơn Nhất, Tân Hòa, Bảy Hiền	Tân Bình
14	8	Nguyễn Hồng Đào		Underground		Tân Bình	Tân Bình
15	9	Bà Quẹo		Underground	L6 (planned); L9 (planned)	Tân Bình, Tây Thạnh (of the former Tân Phú district)	Tân Bình
16	10	Phạm Văn Bạch		Underground		Tân Sơn, Tây Thạnh (of the former Tân Phú district)	Tân Bình
17	11	Tân Bình		Elevated		Tân Sơn, Tây Thạnh (of the former Tân Phú district)	Tân Bình
18	—N/a	Tân Thới Nhất		Elevated		Tân Thới Nhất (Đông Hưng Thuận)	District 12
19	—N/a	Hưng Thuận		Elevated		Đông Hưng Thuận	District 12
20	—N/a	An Sương Bus Terminal	Bến xe An Sương	Elevated		Trung Mỹ Tây	District 12
21	—N/a	Quảng Đức		Elevated		Trung Mỹ Tây	District 12
22	—N/a	Tân Xuân		Elevated		Tân Xuân (Hóc Môn)	Hóc Môn
23	—N/a	Bà Triệu		Elevated		Tân Xuân (Hóc Môn)	Hóc Môn
24	—N/a	Lý Thường Kiệt		Elevated		Hóc Môn	Hóc Môn
25	—N/a	Thống Nhất		Elevated		Tân Thới Nhì (Xuân Thới Sơn)	Hóc Môn
26	—N/a	Tân Thới		Elevated		Tân Thới Nhì (Xuân Thới Sơn)	Hóc Môn
27	—N/a	Tân Hiệp		Elevated		Tân Thới Nhì (Xuân Thới Sơn)	Hóc Môn
28	—N/a	An Hạ		Elevated		Tân Phú Trung (Củ Chi)	Củ Chi
29	—N/a	District Road 2	Hương lộ 2	Elevated		Tân Phú Trung (Củ Chi)	Củ Chi
30	—N/a	Tân Phú Trung		Elevated		Tân Phú Trung (Củ Chi)	Củ Chi
31	—N/a	Lê Minh Nhựt		Elevated		Tân Phú Trung (Củ Chi)	Củ Chi
32	—N/a	Tân Thông Hội		Elevated		Tân Thông Hội (Củ Chi)	Củ Chi
33	—N/a	Trần Văn Chẩm		Elevated		Tân Thông Hội (Củ Chi)	Củ Chi
34	—N/a	Huỳnh Văn Cọ		Elevated		Tân Thông Hội (Củ Chi)	Củ Chi
35	—N/a	Củ Chi		Elevated		Củ Chi Town (Tân An Hội)	Củ Chi
36	—N/a	Củ Chi Hospital	Bệnh viện Củ Chi	Elevated		Tân An Hội	Củ Chi
37	—N/a	Nguyễn Thị Rành		Elevated		Tân An Hội	Củ Chi
38	—N/a	Trung Viết		Elevated		Phước Hiệp (Tân An Hội)	Củ Chi
39	—N/a	Cây Trôm		Elevated		Phước Hiệp (Tân An Hội)	Củ Chi
40	—N/a	Phước Hòa		Elevated		Phước Hiệp (Tân An Hội)	Củ Chi
41	—N/a	Phước Thạnh		Elevated		Phước Thạnh (Thái Mỹ)	Củ Chi
42	—N/a	Provincial Road 7	Tỉnh lộ 7	Elevated		Phước Thạnh (Thái Mỹ)	Củ Chi

*Station names in italic are not yet under construction

== Rolling stock ==
The rolling stock has not been announced yet, and in February 2024, German company Siemens was in talks with the government to build urban rail lines, including Ho Chi Minh City Metro Line 2. Line 2 will use electric multiple units. By 2030, it will use 3-car trains, then increase to 6 cars. Each train is 22 m long, 3.15 m wide, and 3.865 m high. Maximum axle load is 16 tons. The design speed is 90 km/h. Maximum operating speed is 80 km/h. The signaling system uses modern technology, ensuring scientific, efficient and safe train operation with automatic train control systems, automatic train monitoring, computer-based interlocking, train speed detection and measurement, data signal transmission, signal display system, depot signaling and interlocking system, disaster warning system and other auxiliary systems.

On April 23, 2026, South Korean manufacturer Hyundai Rotem signed a contract worth 491 billion South Korean won with Vietnam's Thaco Group for the Line 2 project. With this contract, Hyundai Rotem has been selected as the manufacturer of driverless electric trains for Line 2.
