= Phú Hòa =

Phú Hòa may refer to several places in Vietnam:

- Phú Hòa District, a rural district of Phú Yên Province
- Phú Hòa, Huế, a ward of Huế
- Phú Hòa, Bình Dương, a ward of Thủ Dầu Một
- Phú Hòa, Gia Lai, a township and capital of Chư Păh District
- Phú Hòa, Phú Yên, a township and capital of Phú Hòa District
- Phú Hòa, An Giang, a township and capital of Thoại Sơn District
- Phú Hòa, Đồng Nai, a commune of Định Quán District
- Phú Hòa, Bắc Ninh, a commune of Lương Tài District

== See also ==
- Phú Hòa Đông, a commune of Củ Chi District, Ho Chi Minh City
- Phù Hóa, a commune of Quảng Trạch District, Quảng Bình Province
