= Cu Chi Wildlife Rescue Station =

Rescue center in Ho Chi Minh City, Vietnam

Cu Chi Wildlife Rescue Station (Vietnamese: Trung Tâm bảo tồn động vật hoang dã Củ Chi) is a center located in the Cu Chi District of Ho Chi Minh City that helps rare wild animals recover from captivity and promotes awareness of wildlife-related issues. It is administered by Wildlife at Risk, a non-government organization. It was founded in 2006 and has accepted over 4,000 distressed wild animals. The center's pangolins, bears, otters, leopard cat, binturong, horn bill gibbon, loris, douc langur and other animals may be viewed by visitors.
