= Thu Thiem station =

Under construction metro station in Ho Chi Minh City, Vietnam

Thu Thiem Ga Thủ Thiêm

General information
- Location: Quarter 17, Bình Trưng, Ho Chi Minh City; Vietnam
- Coordinates: 10°47′9″N 106°44′39″E
- Operator: Ho Chi Minh City Metro; Vietnam Railways
- Lines: L2 Thủ Thiêm–Bến Thành–Tham Lương; Thủ Thiêm–Long Thành Light Rail; North–South express railway

Construction
- Structure type: Elevated

Other information
- Status: Under construction

History
- Opening: 2030
Route map
Line 2
Location

Thủ Thiêm Station is an under construction railway hub in An Phú, Thủ Đức, now is Bình Trưng, Ho Chi Minh City, Vietnam. It will serve as the southern terminus station for the North–South express railway, also the Ho Chi Minh City Metro Line 2 and the Thủ Thiêm–Long Thành Light Rail.

Ho Chi Minh City's government has allocated 17.2 hectares (43 acres) for the station in An Phú Ward and was groundbroken on April 30, 2026, along with the Bến Thành–Thủ Thiêm section of Line 2. It is adjacented Mai Chí Thọ Boulevard (East–West Highway) to the south, Cá Trê Canal to the west, and nearby the An Phú Interchange, the west end of Ho Chi Minh City–Long Thanh–Dau Giay Expressway.

== Surrounding area ==
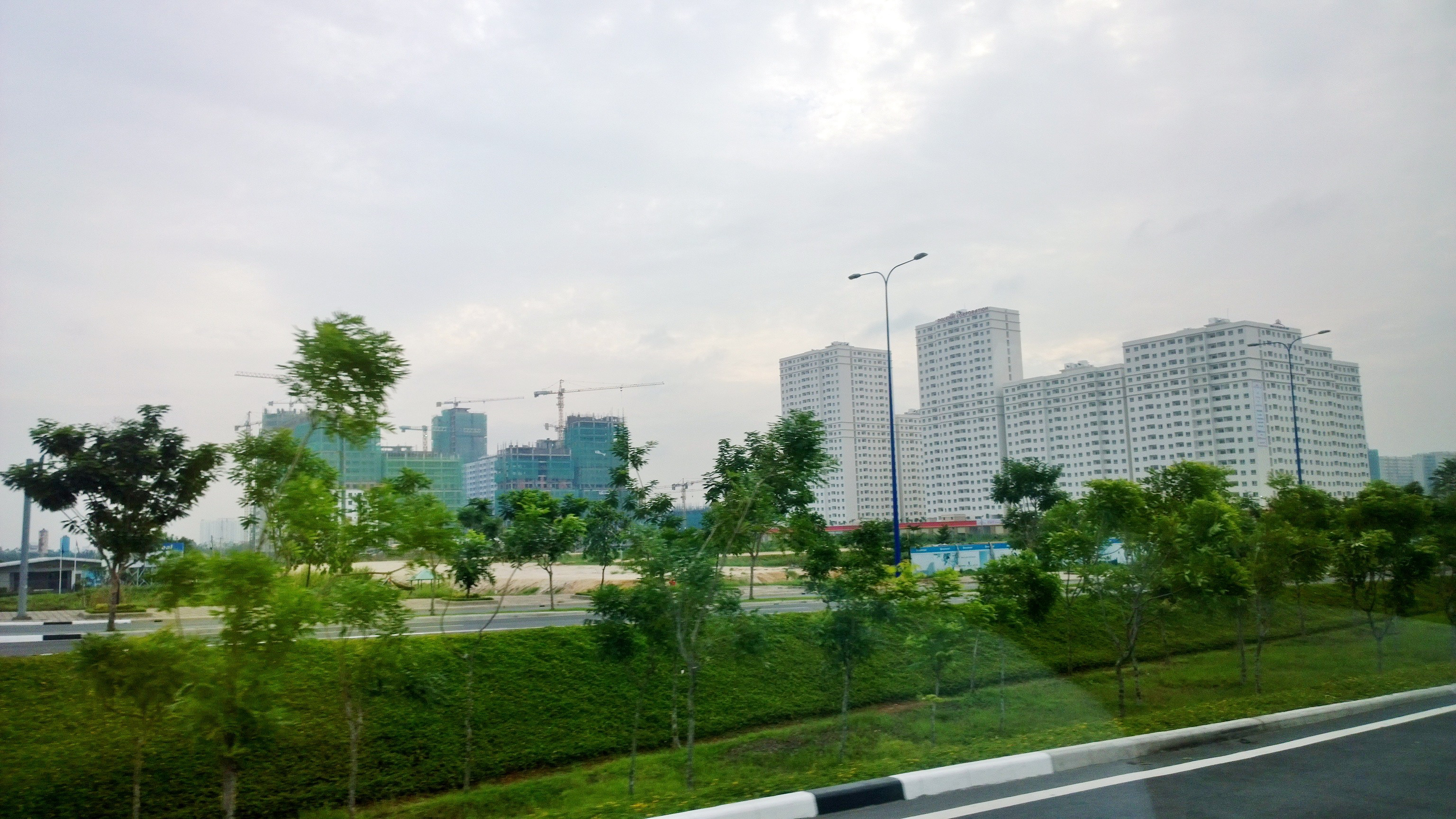
Bình Khánh Residential Area in the west of the station

- Rach Chiec National Sports Complex
- Thủ Thiêm High School
- Lương Định Của Secondary School
- An Khánh Primary School
- Australian International School
- Eaton Park Development by Gamuda Land
- An Phú – An Khánh New City Development
  - MM Mega Market An Phú (formerly Metro Warehouse)
- An Phú New City Development
- Cantavil Premiere – MetroLink An Phú
- Estella Heights – Estella Place Mall by Keppel Land
- The Sun Avenue by Novaland Group
- Văn Minh Residential Area
- Giồng River Residential Area
- Diamond Island Residential Area
- The Global City Development
