= French Military Cemetery, Saigon =

Former French military cemetery in Saigon

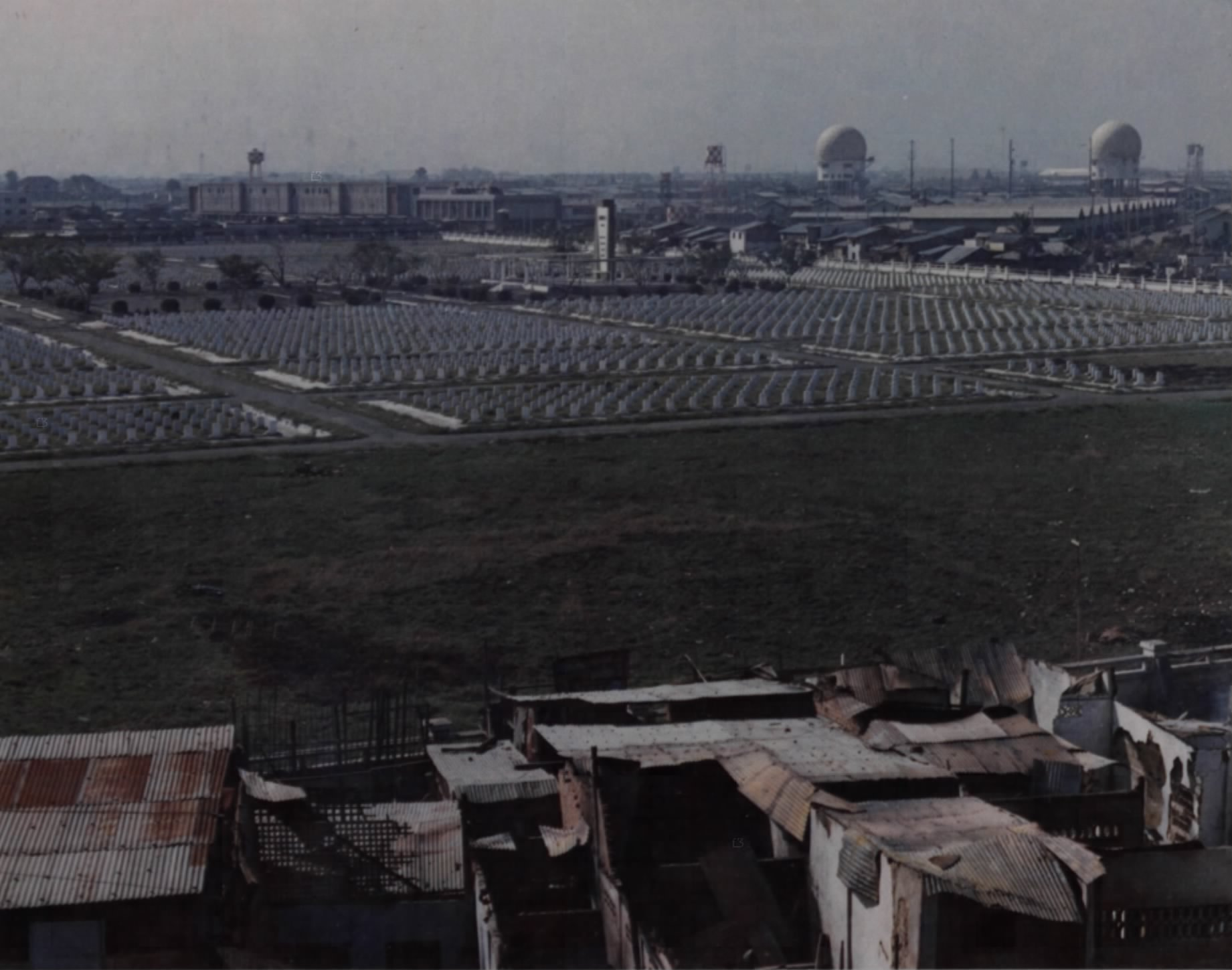
- Interactive map of French Military Cemetery, Saigon

Details
- Closed: August 1986
- Location: Ho Chi Minh City
- Country: Vietnam
- Coordinates: 10.795°N 106.654°E
- Type: Memorial

French Military Cemetery, Saigon (Vietnamese: Nghĩa trang Quân đội Pháp ở Sài Gòn), was a military cemetery in Tân Sơn Hòa, Tân Bình district, Gia Định province (suburb of Saigon then, now is Tân Sơn Nhất, Ho Chi Minh City), Vietnam.

The cemetery was located at the Bảy Hiền intersection, in the south of Tan Son Nhut Air Base.

During the Battle of West Saigon, the cemetery was the scene of extensive fighting between Viet Cong and Army of the Republic of Vietnam forces on 6-7 May 1968.

The cemetery was maintained at French expense, but in 1982 the Vietnamese government requested that the remains be removed from three cemeteries in densely populated areas. Rather than reburying the remains in Vietnam, it was decided to repatriate them to France.

Franco-Vietnamese agreements of August 2, 1986 provided for the repatriation to France of 27,000 bodies of French soldiers and civilians from the Saigon cemetery, Vũng Tàu cemetery and Ba Huyen cemetery near Hanoi. All remains were exhumed and repatriated between 1986 and 1987 and later reinterred at the Mémorial des guerres en Indochine in Fréjus, France.

The former cemetery is now the Tân Bình Gymnasium and Tân Bình Exhibition & Convention Center (TBECC). Underground will have the Bảy Hiền station for Ho Chi Minh City Metro Lines L2 and L5 .
