= Lê Thị Riêng station =

Metro station in Ho Chi Minh City, Vietnam

L2 05 Le Thi Rieng Station Ga Lê Thị Riêng

General information
- Location: Cách Mạng Tháng Tám St. Hòa Hưng ward, Ho Chi Minh City; Vietnam
- System: Ho Chi Minh City Metro station
- Line: L2

Construction
- Structure type: Underground

Other information
- Status: Under construction

History
- Opening: 2030

Services
Preceding station	Ho Chi Minh City Metro	Following station
Hòa Hưng L2 04 towards Ben Thanh	Line 2 Phase 1 - Opening 2030-2032	Phạm Văn Hai L2 06 towards Tân Bình
Location

Lê Thị Riêng Station (Vietnamese: Ga Lê Thị Riêng) is an underground metro station, currently under construction as part of the Ho Chi Minh City Metro's Line 2. The station sits north of the Lê Thị Riêng Cultural Park on Cách Mạng Tháng Tám St., Hòa Hưng ward (adjacent to Nhiêu Lộc ward).

== Surrounding areas ==
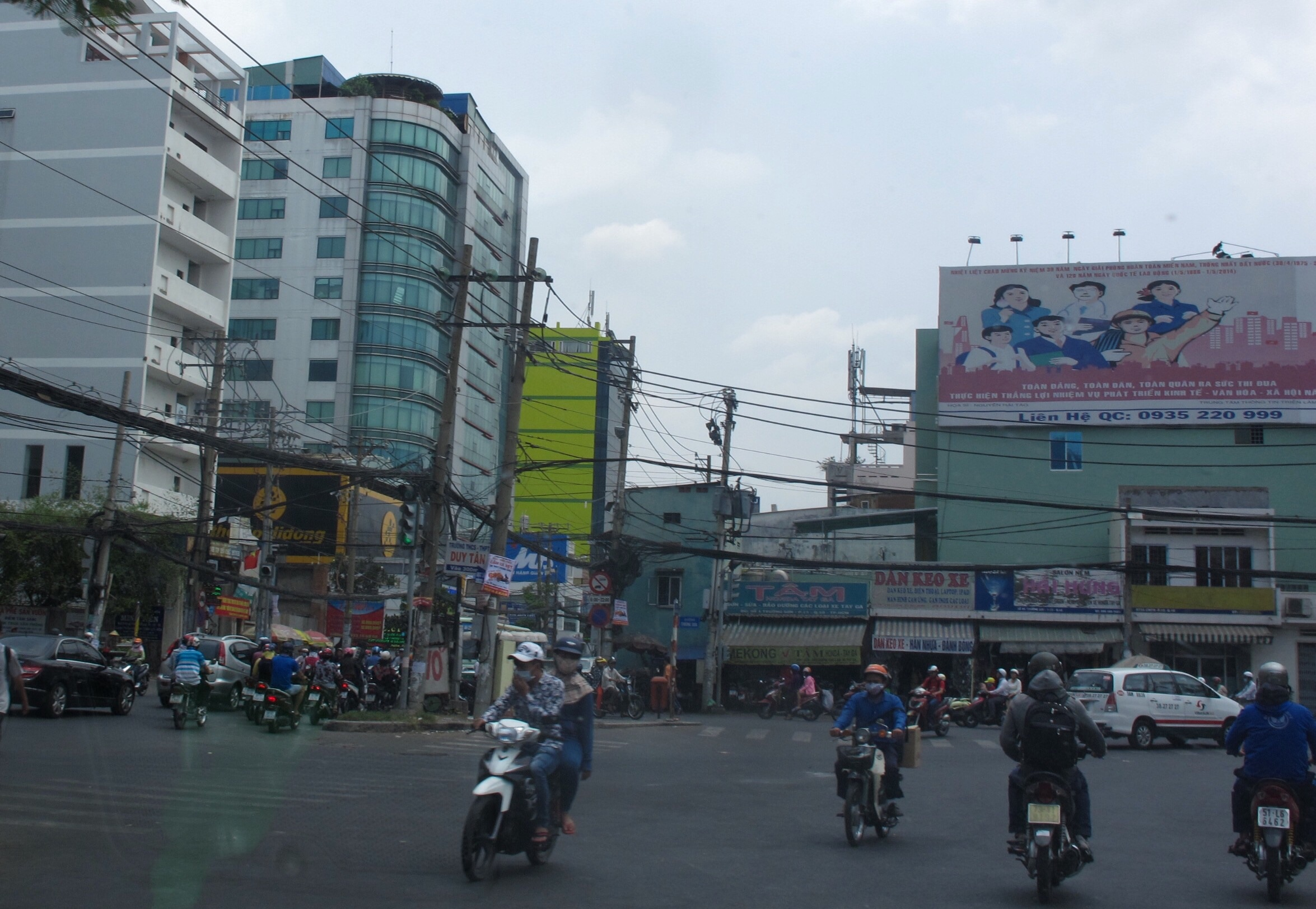
Intersection between August Cách Mạng Tháng Tám St. and Trường Sơn St., where the station is located underground.

- 590 Cách Mạng Tháng Tám Residential Area
- Bắc Hải Residential Area
  - Lê Thị Riêng Park
- C30 Development Area
  - Ho Chi Minh City Hospital of Post and Telecoms (P&T) General Hospital (Bệnh viện Đa khoa Bưu Điện)
  - C30 Hòa Bình Cultural Center
  - Hòa Hưng Children House / Hoàng Thái Thanh Theatre
  - Kingdom 101 Apartment
- Mobifone Building at Ho Chi Minh City
- VNPT-Net2 Building – Southern Network Infrastructure Center
- Ho Chi Minh City University of Technology
- Nguyễn Du High School
- Hoà Hưng Evangelical Church
- Lộc Hưng Quarter
  - Mạc Đĩnh Chi Secondary School
  - Hùng Vương Primary School
  - Sơn Ca Kindergarten
  - Lộc Hưng Park
  - Lộc Hưng Parish Church
