= Nhuận Đức =

Nhuận Đức Xã Nhuận Đức
- Commune
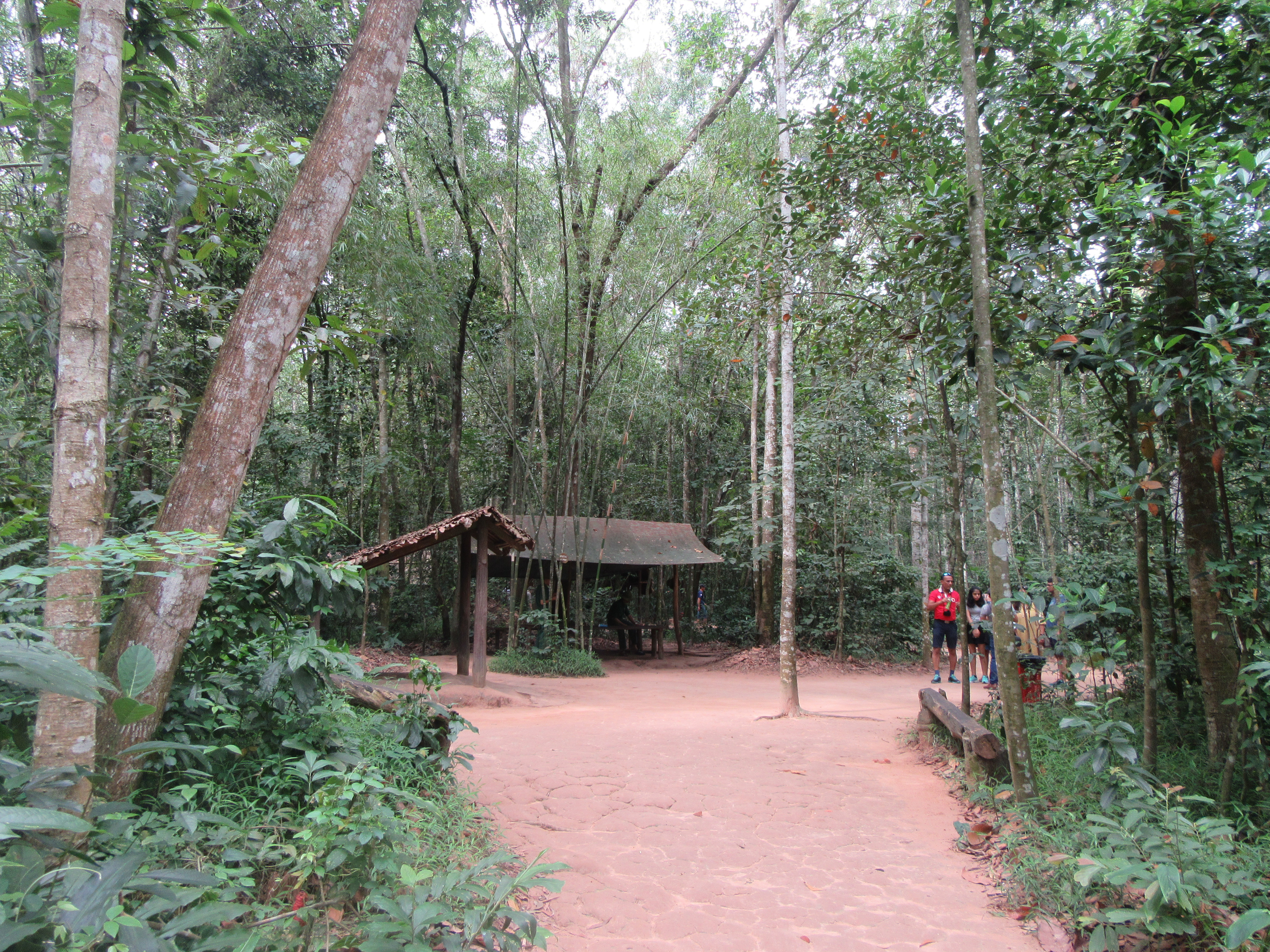
- The Bến Đình site of the Củ Chi tunnel complex
- Interactive map of Nhuận Đức
- Coordinates: 11°01′57″N 106°29′04″E
- Country: Vietnam
- Municipality: Ho Chi Minh City
- Established: June 16, 2025

Area
  - Total: 23.96 sq mi (62.06 km^{2})

Population (2024)
  - Total: 40,239
  - Density: 1,679/sq mi (648.4/km^{2})
- Time zone: UTC+07:00 (Indochina Time)
- Administrative code: 27511

Nhuận Đức (Vietnamese: Xã Nhuận Đức) is a commune of Ho Chi Minh City, Vietnam. It is one of the 168 new wards, communes and special zones of the city following the reorganization in 2025.

The commune is the location of the Bến Đình site of the Củ Chi tunnel complex, and the Agricultural Hi-tech Park of Ho Chi Minh City (AHTP).

== History ==
On June 16, 2025, the National Assembly Standing Committee issued Resolution No. 1685/NQ-UBTVQH15 on the arrangement of commune-level administrative units of Ho Chi Minh City in 2025 (effective from June 16, 2025). Accordingly, the entire land area and population of Phạm Văn Cội, Trung Lập Hạ and Nhuận Đức communes of the former Củ Chi district will be integrated into a new commune named Nhuận Đức (Clause 127, Article 1).
