= Nguyễn Minh Thuyết =

Vietnamese politician (born 1948)

- In office 1997–2012
- Majority: Vietnam Communist Party

Nguyễn Minh Thuyết (born 1948) is a Vietnamese legislator, serving since the Eleventh National Assembly from 2002 to 2007 and was reelected in the Twelfth National Assembly which will last until 2012.

He is a member of Vietnam Communist Party (sworn in since 1991) and currently holds a position as a vice chairman of the Vietnam National Assembly's Culture and Education Committee.

== Early life and education ==
Thuyết graduated as a linguist from Vietnam University of Social Science and Humanity. He managed to earn a PhD and served in the university as a professor from 1990 to 2003.

Prior to swearing in as a legislator he was also in charge of the Assembly's Committee of Science, Technology and Environment.

== Vietnam National Assembly ==
In the role of a member of the parliament, Nguyen Minh Thuyet represents for Lang Son's 11th and 12th congressional province since 1997; besides, he is also a vice chairman of the National Assembly's Culture and Education Committee.

He is well known for being outspoken, straightforward and active in Vietnam's political life, particularly through burning debates in thorny issues in every Assembly’ conference and meeting regarding to law enforcement consequences of the cabinet.

He is one of the most distinct members of the Vietnam National Assembly who strongly objected the controversial economic projects such as Vietnam's bauxite project in the Central Highlands, plans to build nuclear power plants and an Express Railway connecting Hanoi to Ho Chi Minh City.

In early November 2010 he formally proposed for a temporary Assembly-formed panel to investigate Vinashin shipbuilding group, an economical and political worst-ever scandal which was believed cost the Vietnam economy nearly 80 trillion dong ($5.0 billion) but got rejected as, according to state media, there are ongoing investigations from associated communist agencies, police and the Central Committee of Supervision.

Soon after the proposal got rejected by the Central Board of National Assembly, there are concerns whether he would suffer from political consequences for his request.

He has led a call for answers from the communist-driven government since and demanded a vote of no confidence on the Prime Minister Nguyễn Tấn Dũng, who is also a member of the powerful Politfuro Standing Committee.
