= Thủ Thiêm–Long Thành Light Rail =

Proposed railway line in Vietnam

Thủ Thiêm–Long Thành Metro

Overview
- Other name: Thủ Thiêm–Long Thành International Airport Metro
- Native name: Tuyến Metro Thủ Thiêm–Cảng hàng không Quốc tế Long Thành; Tuyến Metro Thủ Thiêm–Long Thành
- Status: Planning
- Locale: Ho Chi Minh City & Đồng Nai, Southeast Vietnam
- Termini: Thủ Thiêm Station; Long Thanh International Airport
- Stations: 20

Service
- Type: MRT
- Depot: Cẩm Đường

History
- Planned opening: 2030

Technical
- Line length: 41.83 km (25.99 mi)
- Operating speed: 120 km/h (75 mph); 90 km/h (55.92 mph) (underground)
- Average inter-station distance: 2.1 km (1.30 mi)

The Thủ Thiêm–Long Thành Metro (Vietnamese: Tuyến Metro Thủ Thiêm–Cảng hàng không quốc tế Long Thành / Tuyến Metro Thủ Thiêm–Long Thành) or initially known as Thủ Thiêm–Long Thành Light Rail (Vietnamese: Tuyến đường sắt nhẹ Thủ Thiêm–Cảng hàng không quốc tế Long Thành / Tuyến đường sắt nhẹ Thủ Thiêm–Long Thành), is a proposed MRT line in southern Vietnam connecting Thủ Thiêm Station in Ho Chi Minh City with Long Thành International Airport in Đồng Nai. The 41.83 kilometres (25.99 mi) railway will have 20 stations.

== Stations ==
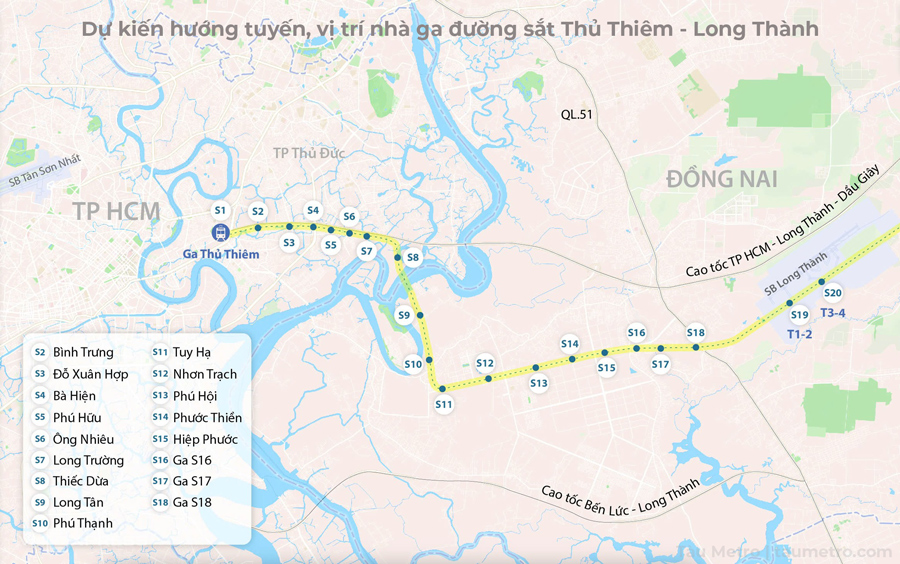
Route map of Thủ Thiêm – Long Thành Line

The Thủ Thiêm–Long Thành metro is expected to be 41.83km long. Of which, the railway passing through Ho Chi Minh City is 11.75km long and 30.08km long in Đồng Nai with tally 20 stations, mostly are elevated and underground for the four last stations toward Long Thành International Airport.

Station number	Station name	Layout	Metro transfers	Distance		Location		
Station number	Station name	Layout	Metro transfers	between stations	in total	Former commune-level subdivisions (current)	Former district-level subdivisions	Municipality
1	Thủ Thiêm	Elevated	2 (under construction); North–South express railway (planned)	0.0 km (0 mi)	0.0 km (0 mi)	An Phú Ward (Bình Trưng)	Thủ Đức City	Ho Chi Minh City
2	Bình Trưng	Elevated		1.785 km (1.11 mi)	1.785 km (1.11 mi)	An Phú Ward (Bình Trưng)	Thủ Đức City	Ho Chi Minh City
3	Đỗ Xuân Hợp	Elevated		1.75 km (1.09 mi)	3.525 km (2.19 mi)	An Phú Ward (Bình Trưng)	Thủ Đức City	Ho Chi Minh City
4	Bà Hiện	Elevated		1.37 km (0.85 mi)	4.895 km (3.04 mi)	Phú Hữu Ward (Long Trường)	Thủ Đức City	Ho Chi Minh City
5	Phú Hữu	Elevated		1.11 km (0.69 mi)	6.005 km (3.73 mi)	Phú Hữu Ward (Long Trường)	Thủ Đức City	Ho Chi Minh City
6	Ông Nhiêu	Elevated		1.04 km (0.65 mi)	7.045 km (4.38 mi)	Phú Hữu Ward (Long Trường)	Thủ Đức City	Ho Chi Minh City
7	Long Trường	Elevated		1.21 km (0.75 mi)	8.265 km (5.14 mi)	Long Trường	Thủ Đức City	Ho Chi Minh City
8	Thiếc Dừa	Elevated		1.78 km (1.11 mi)	10.045 km (6.24 mi)	Long Trường	Thủ Đức City	Ho Chi Minh City
9	Long Tân	Elevated		3.92 km (2.44 mi)	13.965 km (8.68 mi)	Phú Thạnh Commune (Nhơn Trạch)	Nhơn Trạch District	Đồng Nai
10	Phú Thạnh	Elevated		2.54 km (1.58 mi)	16.505 km (10.26 mi)	Phú Thạnh Commune (Nhơn Trạch)	Nhơn Trạch District	Đồng Nai
11	Tuy Hạ	Elevated		1.95 km (1.21 mi)	18.455 km (11.47 mi)	Phú Thạnh Commune (Nhơn Trạch)	Nhơn Trạch District	Đồng Nai
12	Nhơn Trạch	Elevated		2.8 km (1.74 mi)	21.255 km (13.21 mi)	Phú Hội Commune (Nhơn Trạch)	Nhơn Trạch District	Đồng Nai
13	Phú Hội	Elevated		2.72 km (1.69 mi)	23.975 km (14.90 mi)	Phú Hội Commune (Nhơn Trạch)	Nhơn Trạch District	Đồng Nai
14	Phước Thiền	Elevated		2.13 km (1.32 mi)	26.105 km (16.22 mi)	Hiệp Phước Town (Nhơn Trạch)	Nhơn Trạch District	Đồng Nai
15	Hiệp Phước	Elevated		1.85 km (1.15 mi)	27.955 km (17.37 mi)	Hiệp Phước Town (Nhơn Trạch)	Nhơn Trạch District	Đồng Nai
16	S16	Elevated		2.09 km (1.30 mi)	30.045 km (18.67 mi)	Long An Commune (Long Thành)	Long Thành District	Đồng Nai
17	S17	Underground		1.75 km (1.09 mi)	31.795 km (19.76 mi)	Long Phước Commune	Long Thành District	Đồng Nai
18	S18	Underground		1.84 km (1.14 mi)	33.635 km (20.90 mi)	Long Phước Commune	Long Thành District	Đồng Nai
19	Long Thành T1-2	Underground	North–South express railway (planned)	5.92 km (3.68 mi)	39.555 km (24.58 mi)	Bình Sơn Commune (Long Thành)	Long Thành District	Đồng Nai
20	Long Thành T3-4	Underground	North–South express railway (planned)	2.21 km (1.37 mi)	41.765 km (25.95 mi)	Bình Sơn Commune (Long Thành)	Long Thành District	Đồng Nai
