= Mémorial des guerres en Indochine =

National necropolis in Fréjus, Var, France

- France
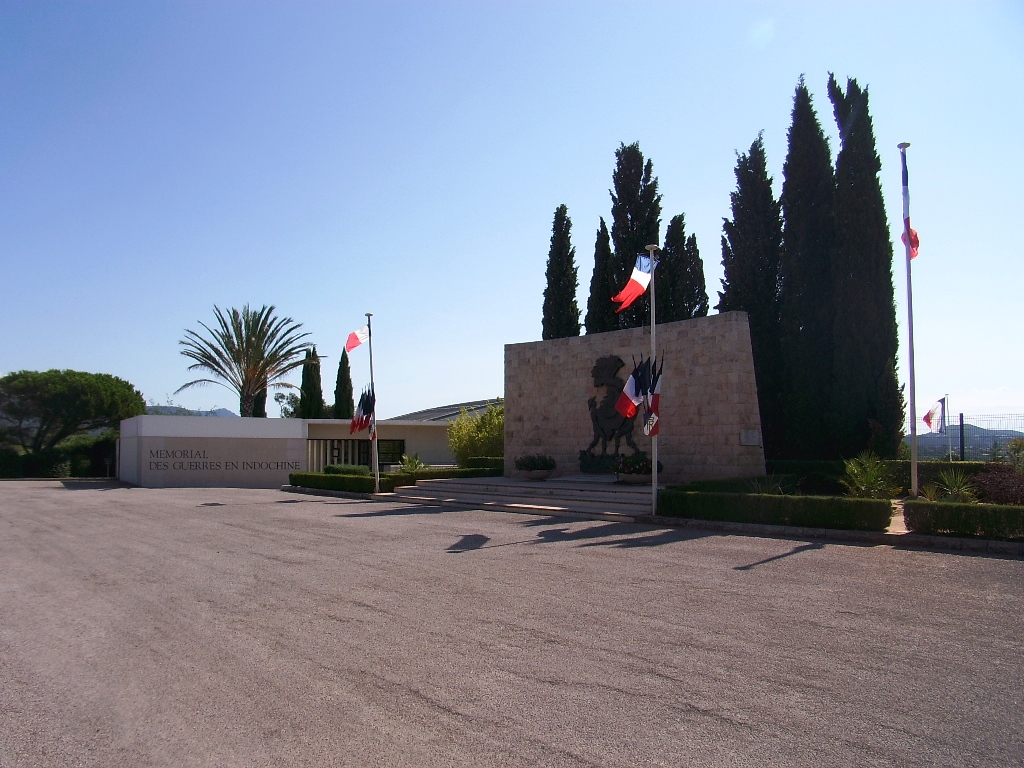
- Mémorial des guerres en Indochine
- For French dead of the First Indochina War
- Unveiled: 16 February 1993 by François Mitterrand
- Location: 43°26′43″N 6°45′06″E near Fréjus, France
- Designed by: Bernard Desmoulin
- Total burials: 17,250
- Unknowns: 3,152
- Commemorated: 34,935

The Mémorial des guerres en Indochine (Indochina War Memorial) is located in the municipality of Fréjus, Gallieni sector, in the Var department. It was inaugurated on 16 February 1993 by François Mitterrand, President of France. The bodies resting in the national necropolis of Fréjus are those of soldiers Morts pour la France (Died for France) who died either between 1940 and 1945, or, for the most part, between 1946 and 1954 in the First Indochina War.

== Background ==
At the end of the First Indochina War thousands of French soldiers and civilians remained buried in cemeteries in North and South Vietnam. The cemeteries were maintained at French expense, but in 1982 the Vietnamese government requested that the remains be removed from three cemeteries in densely populated areas. Rather than reburying the remains in Vietnam, it was decided to repatriate them to France.

The Franco-Vietnamese agreements of 2 August 1986 provided for the repatriation to France of 27,000 bodies of French soldiers and civilians from the Saigon cemetery, Vũng Tàu cemetery and Ba Huyen cemetery near Hanoi. The city of Fréjus offered to host the memorial to the wars in Indochina on the site of the former Gallieni military camp, where Indochinese riflemen stayed in particular during World War I (within the transit center for indigenous colonial troops) and where the first monument commemorating the Indochina wars already appeared in 1983.

The first set of remains of 833 French soldiers in ten coffins were transported from Ho Chi Minh City via Bangkok to Paris, where they were received on 10 October 1986 by Prime Minister of France Jacques Chirac. Further repatriations continued until October 1987.

The memorial was inaugurated on 16 February 1993 by François Mitterrand, President of France.

== The memorial ==
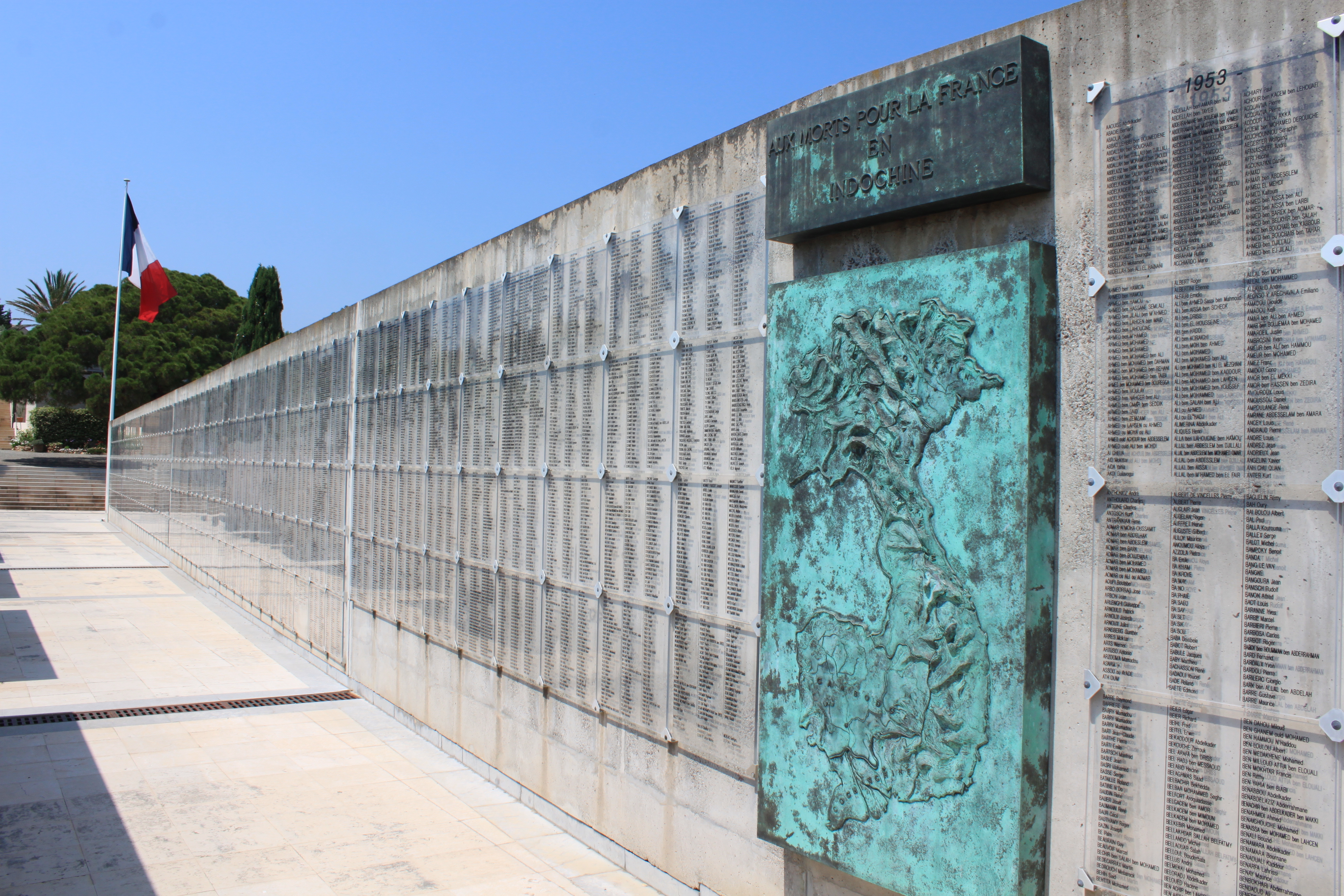
Remembrance Wall

Designed by architect Bernard Desmoulin, the memorial is located on 23,403m2 of land, forming part of a circular promenade 110m in diameter, built in concrete and resting on stilts. The circle takes up the theme of the journey and symbolizes at the same time the military enclosure as an inheritor of the spiritual circle of tribes.

A worship space, inaugurated in 1996, provides for ceremonies for four religions: Christianity, Islam, Buddhism and Judaism. The memorial adjoins the Buddhist pagoda Pagode Hông Hiên Tu.

A remembrance wall was also inaugurated in 1996. The wall is 64m long, crossing the main building are inscribed, on 438 plaques, on either side of a bronze map of Indochina, 34,935 names of soldiers killed during the Indochina war whose bodies do not rest in Fréjus (missing, left behind or returned to families). The names are arranged by year of death and then listed in alphabetical order.

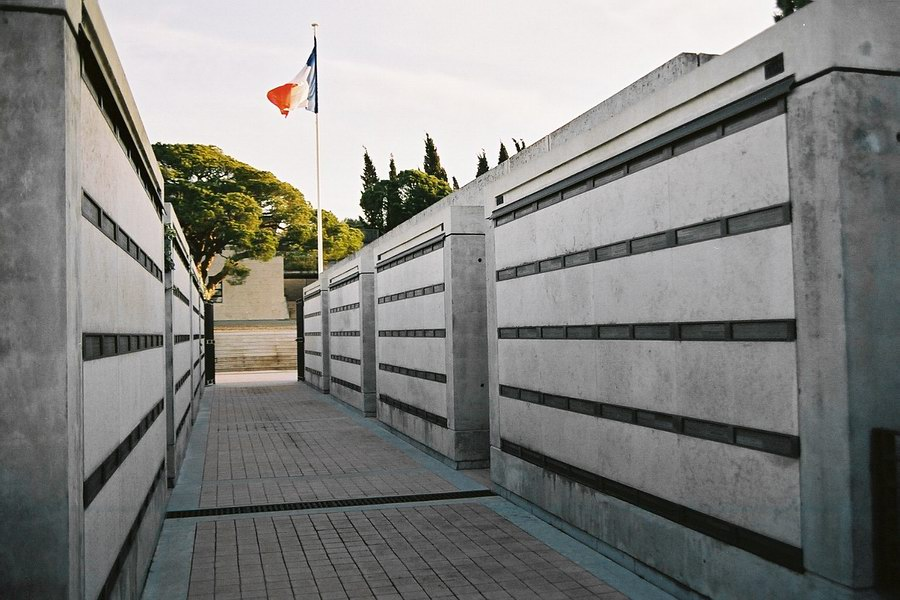
Burial vaults

The necropolis is organized on two levels, at the foot of the circular promenade:

- the lower level is devoted to the dead from South Vietnam; and
- the upper level is devoted to the dead from North Vietnam.

Rows of vaults contain the bones of the 17,188 soldiers identified and repatriated from Vietnam. In addition there are 62 bodies of soldiers transferred from the Nécropole Nationale of Luynes where they had been buried before 1975. The bodies resting in the necropolis of Fréjus are those of soldiers Morts pour la France who died either between 1940 and 1945 during the Japanese occupation, or, mostly, between 1946 and 1954. In addition, in the crypt of the memorial, 3,152 unknown dead lie in an Ossuary. 3,515 French civilians, including 25 unidentified, were also buried on the site, in a Columbarium built under the northern section.

The memorial contains a small museum detailing the history of French Indochina.

In 1997 it was estimated that the memorial was visited by fewer than 30,000 visitors per year.

== Notable burials ==
- General Marcel Bigeard, hero of the Battle of Dien Bien Phu, his ashes were interred here in 2012
- Chief warrant officer Jean Trescases, has his name inscribed on the wall of remembrance.

== National day of homage to the dead for France in Indochina ==
French decree number 2005-547 of 26 May 2005 established 8 June as a national day of homage to the dead for France in Indochina. 8 June was the date on which the remains of the Unknown Soldier of Indochina were interred at the national necropolis at Notre Dame de Lorette in 1980.
