= Tân Bình, Ho Chi Minh City =

Tân Bình Phường Tân Bình
- Ward
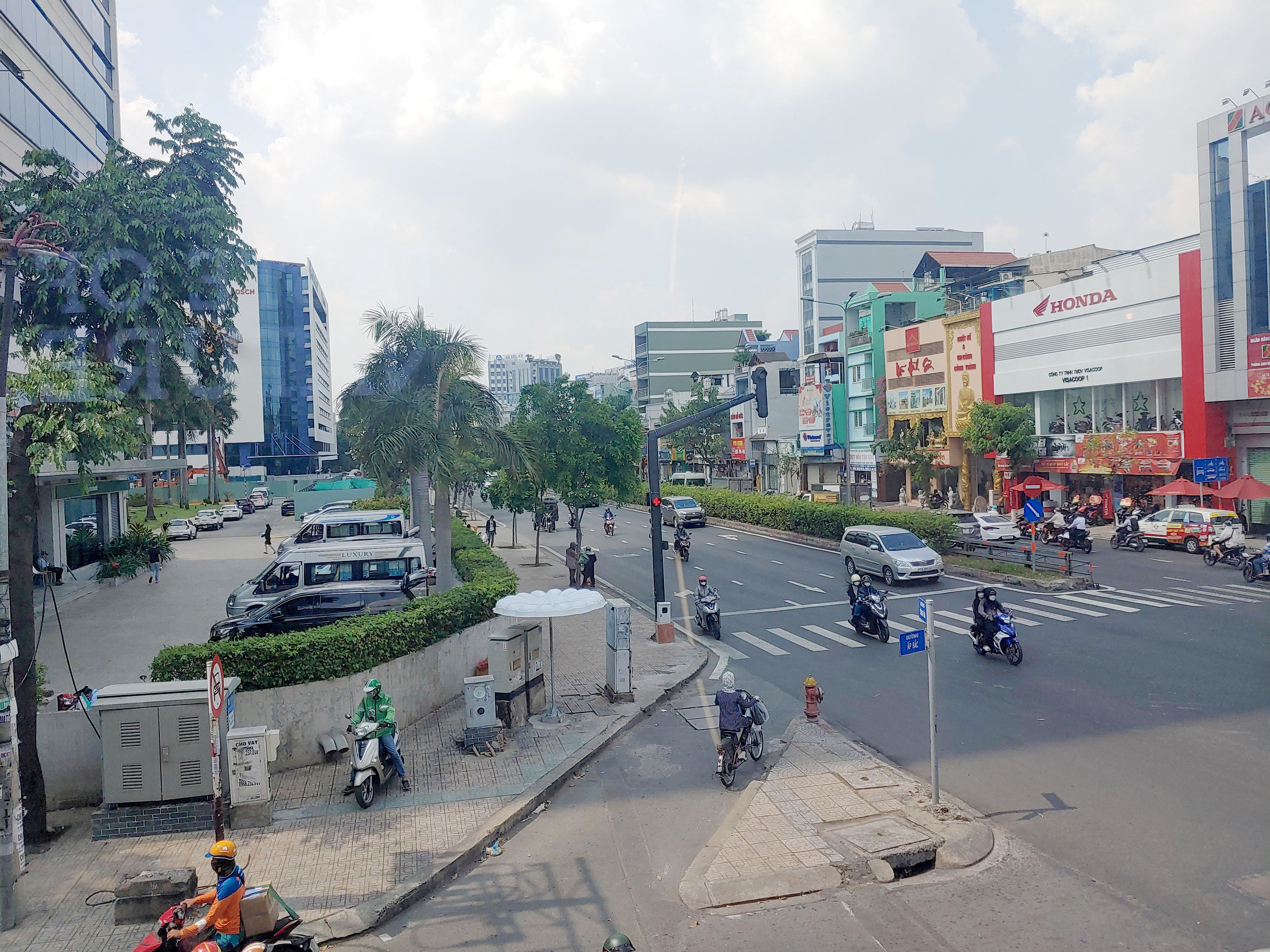
- Intersection of Cộng Hòa and Ấp Bắc, Tân Bình
- Interactive map of Tân Bình
- Coordinates: 10°47′57″N 106°38′29″E
- Country: Vietnam
- Municipality: Ho Chi Minh City
- Established: June 16, 2025

Area
  - Total: 0.82 sq mi (2.12 km^{2})

Population (2024)
  - Total: 89,373
  - Density: 109,000/sq mi (42,200/km^{2})
- Time zone: UTC+07:00 (Indochina Time)
- Administrative code: 27004

Tân Bình (Vietnamese: Phường Tân Bình) is a ward of Ho Chi Minh City, Vietnam. It is one of the 168 new wards, communes and special zones of the city following the reorganization in 2025.

== History ==
On June 16, 2025, the National Assembly Standing Committee issued Resolution No. 1685/NQ-UBTVQH15 on the arrangement of commune-level administrative units of Ho Chi Minh City in 2025 (effective from June 16, 2025). Accordingly, the entire land area and population of Ward 13, Ward 14 and part of Ward 15 of the former Tân Bình district will be integrated into a new ward named Tân Bình (Clause 60, Article 1).
