= Thái Mỹ =

Thái Mỹ Xã Thái Mỹ Phước Thạnh, Trung Lập Thượng
- Commune
- Seal
- Interactive map of Thái Mỹ
- Coordinates: 10°58′59″N 106°23′39″E
- Country: Vietnam
- Municipality: Ho Chi Minh City
- Established: June 16, 2025

Area
  - Total: 24.11 sq mi (62.44 km^{2})

Population (2024)
  - Total: 49,862
  - Density: 2,068/sq mi (798.6/km^{2})
- Time zone: UTC+07:00 (Indochina Time)
- Administrative code: 27526

Thái Mỹ (Vietnamese: Xã Thái Mỹ) is a commune of Ho Chi Minh City, Vietnam. It is one of the 168 new wards, communes and special zones of the city following the reorganization in 2025.

== History ==
On June 16, 2025, the National Assembly Standing Committee issued Resolution No. 1685/NQ-UBTVQH15 on the arrangement of commune-level administrative units of Ho Chi Minh City in 2025 (effective from June 16, 2025). Accordingly, the entire land area and population of Trung Lập Thượng, Phước Thạnh and Thái Mỹ communes of the former Củ Chi district will be integrated into a new commune named Thái Mỹ (Clause 125, Article 1).
