= International German School Ho Chi Minh City =

International German School Ho Chi Minh City (IGS HCMC)
- Deutsche Schule Ho Chi Minh Stadt

Location
- 253/11 (251A) Lương Định Của, An Phú, Thủ Đức; Ho Chi Minh City; Vietnam; 10.790353°N 106.748036°E

Information
- Type: Overseas German School (Deutsche Auslandsschule)
- Motto: "Die Grenzen meiner Sprache sind die Grenzen meiner Welt." -Ludwig Wittgenstein (The limits of my language are the limits of my world.)
- Established: 2012
- Founder: Stiftung Bildung und Handwerk
- Status: Opening
- Category: International School
- Oversight: ZfA (Zentralstelle für das Auslandsschulwesen)
- Headmaster: Clauspeter Wollenweber
- Faculty: 20
- Teaching staff: 30
- Grades: K–12
- Average class size: 18
- Education system: Federal State of Thüringen
- Classes offered: German as a mother/foreign language, English Literature, Math, Physics, Chemistry, Biology, Early Sciences (for primary), History, Geography, Music, Art, French as a foreign language, Vietnamese as a mother language (for Vietnamese citizens), ICT, Ethics, Sports, Swimming
- Language: German, English (ICT, Geography, Music, Art only)
- Hours in school day: 9 periods of 45 minutes
- Classrooms: around 15
- Campuses: only 1
- Campus size: small
- Campus type: modern
- Student Union/Association: Student Council
- Colours: Red, Green
- Mascot: Green Parrot
- Newspaper
- Annual tuition
- Alumni name: Mixed IB Diploma
- Website: www.igs-hcmc.org

Deutsche Schule Ho Chi Minh City - International German School, shortened as IGS, is an international and overseas German school in Ho Chi Minh City offering a German education from Kindergarten to IB Diploma. German graduation certificates (from 2020) and the mixed-language IB diploma program (from 2022) are offered.

In September 2025, the school moved to a newly built campus at 253 Luong Dinh Cua, having previously been at 12 Vo Truong Toan.

== Profile ==
The International German School (IGS) was founded in 2012, initiated by the Federal Foreign Office and carried by the Stiftung Bildung und Handwerk (SBH).

== Gallery ==
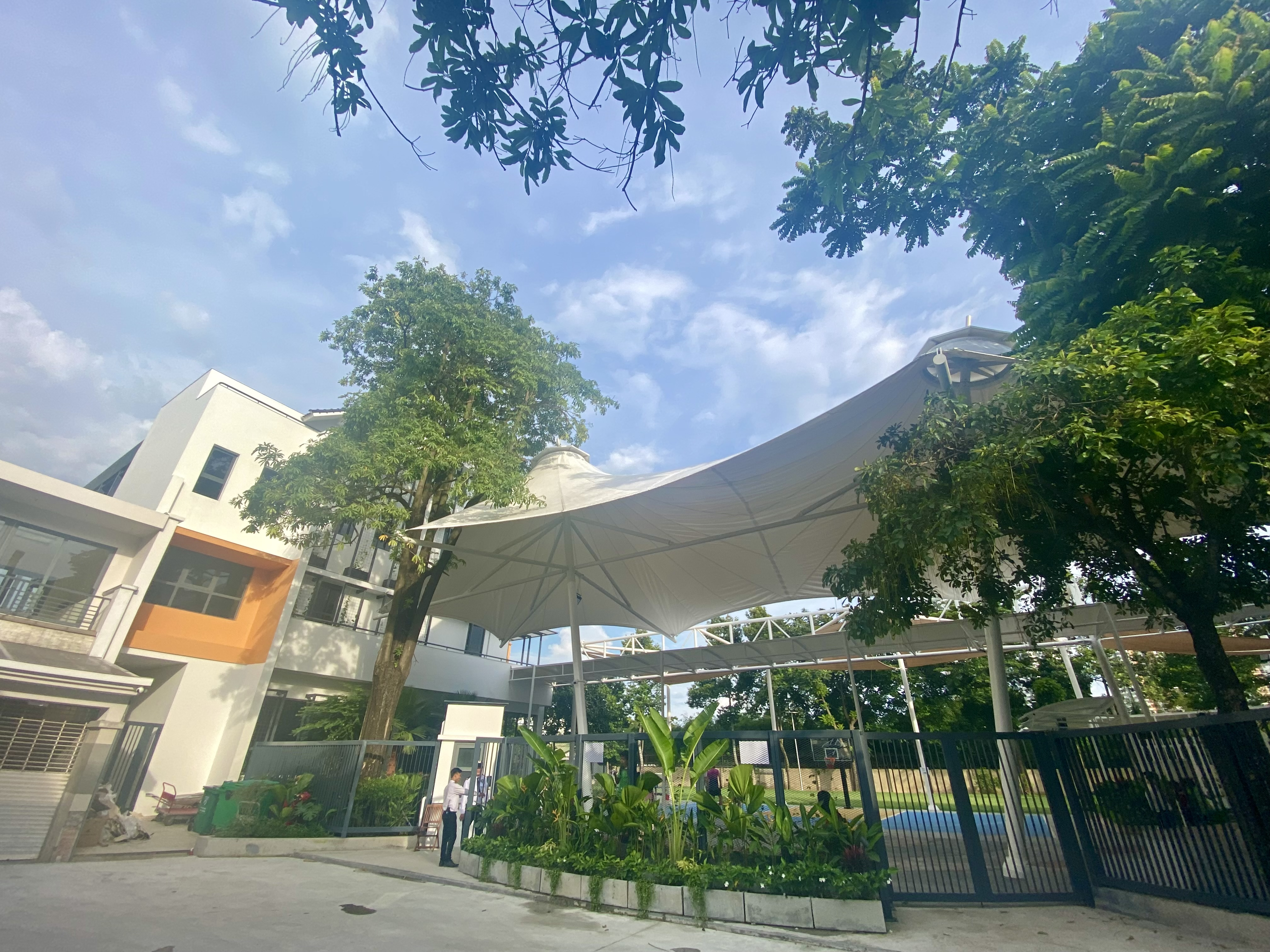
Front gate 2025

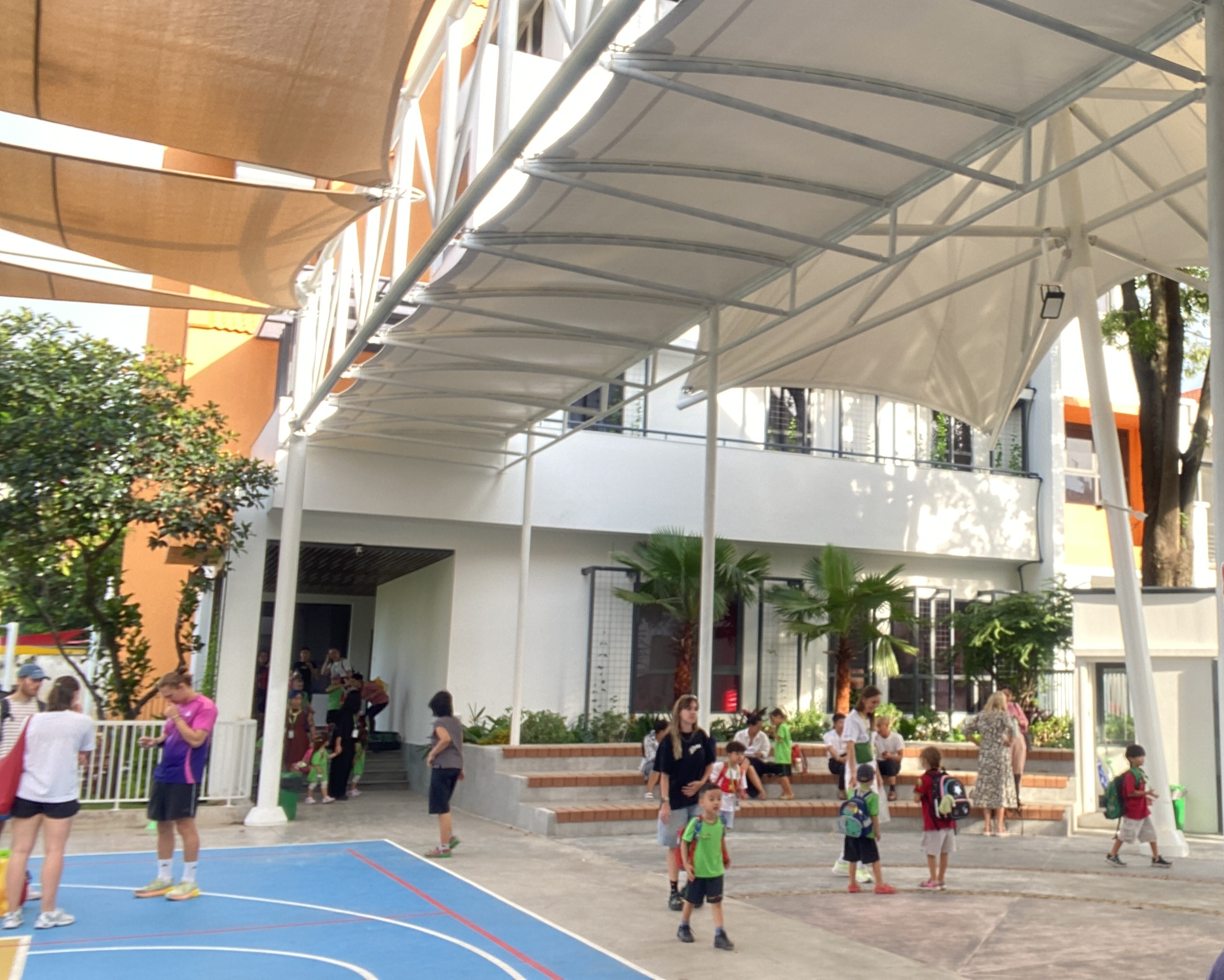
New campus 2025

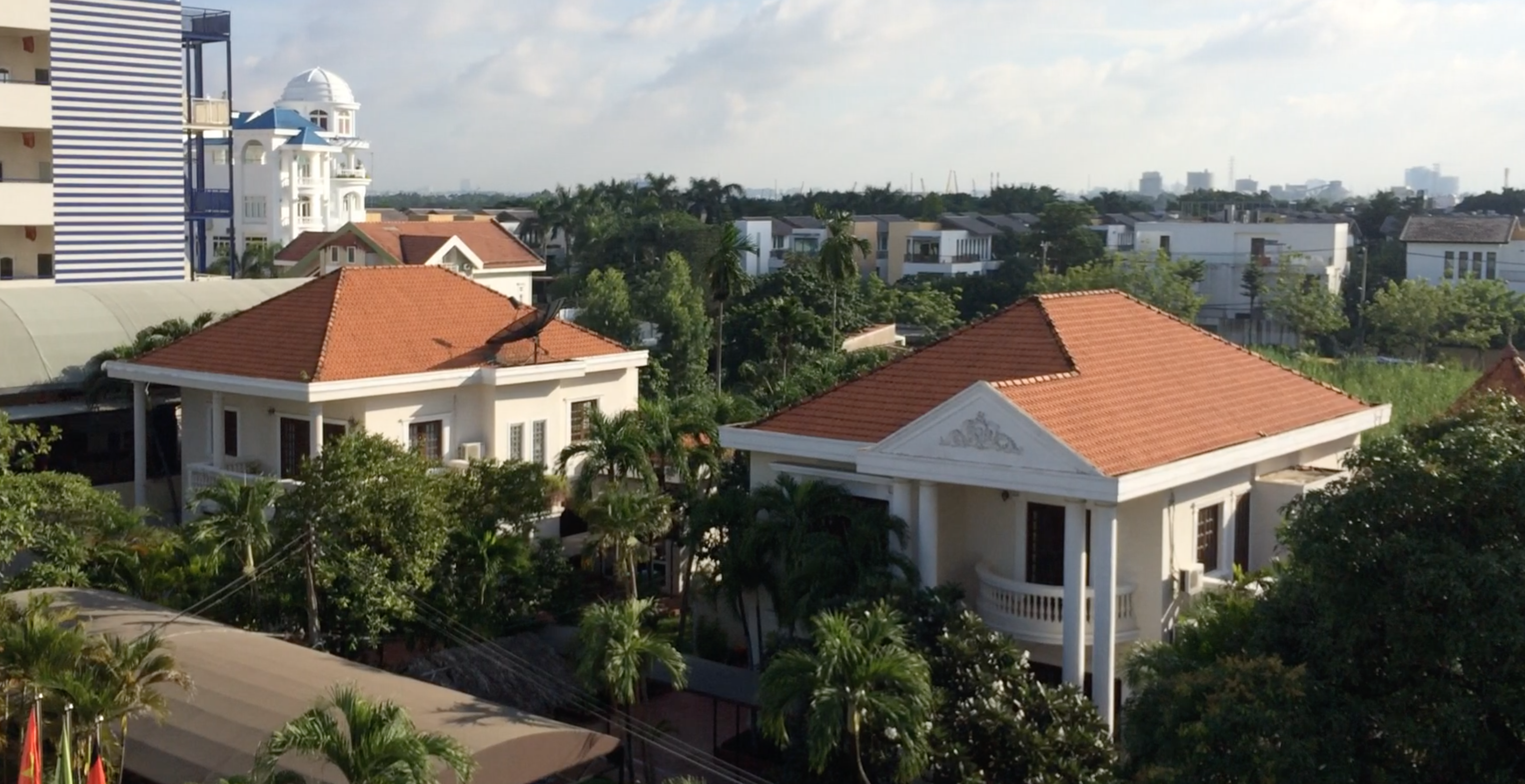
Kindergarten and Primary building 2016

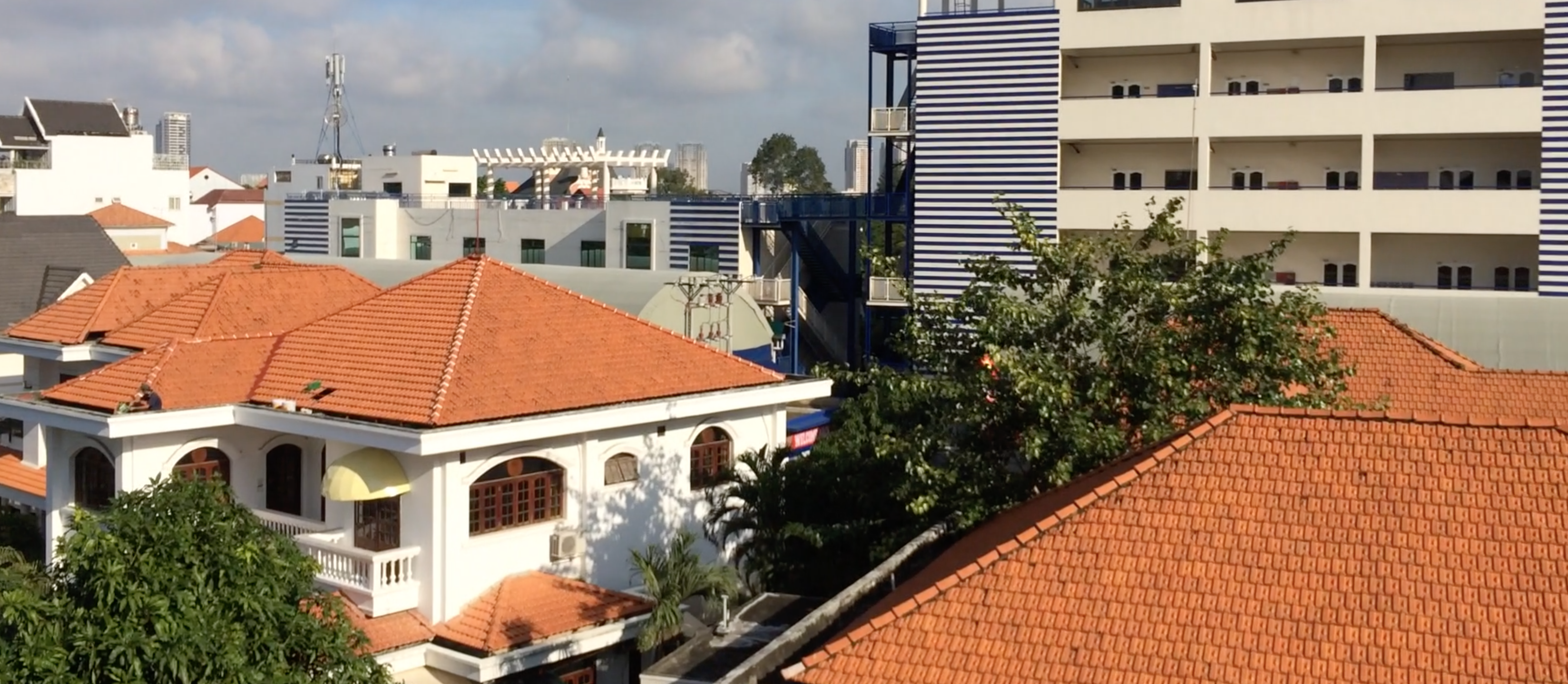
Secondary building 2016

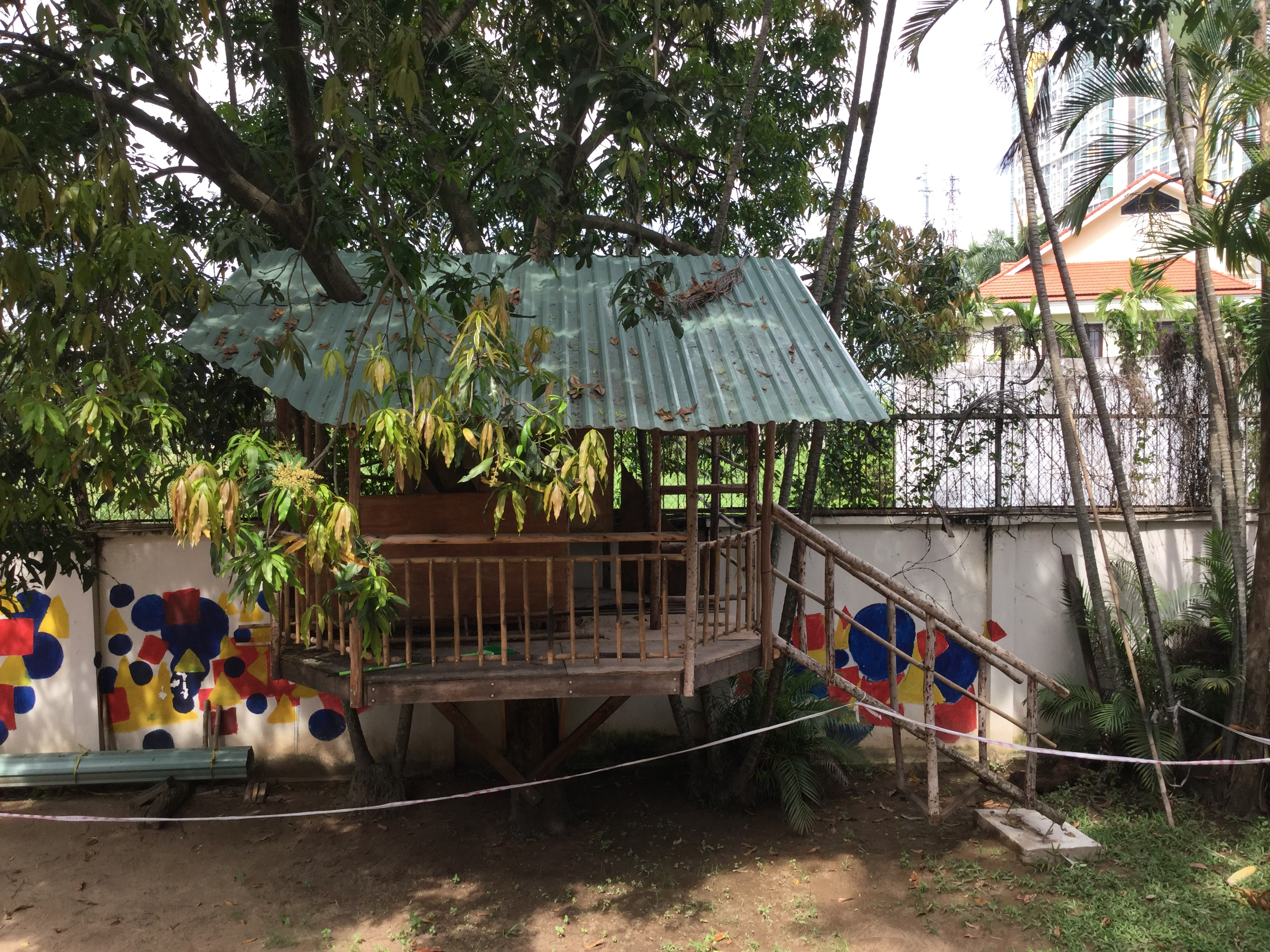
Old tree house for the students in the school playground 2017
