= Tân An Hội =

Tân An Hội Xã Tân An Hội Củ Chi
- Commune
- Củ Chi Overpass
- Interactive map of Tân An Hội
- Coordinates: 10°58′19″N 106°29′40″E
- Country: Vietnam
- Municipality: Ho Chi Minh City
- Established: June 16, 2025

Area
  - Total: 20.66 sq mi (53.51 km^{2})

Population (2024)
  - Total: 84,342
  - Density: 4,082/sq mi (1,576/km^{2})
- Time zone: UTC+07:00 (Indochina Time)
- Administrative code: 27496

Tân An Hội (Vietnamese: Xã Tân An Hội) is a commune of Ho Chi Minh City, Vietnam. It is one of the 168 new wards, communes and special zones of the city following the reorganization in 2025.

== History ==
On June 16, 2025, the National Assembly Standing Committee issued Resolution No. 1685/NQ-UBTVQH15 on the arrangement of commune-level administrative units of Ho Chi Minh City in 2025 (effective from June 16, 2025). Accordingly, the entire land area and population of Củ Chi township and Phước Hiệp, Tân An Hội communes of the former Củ Chi district will be integrated into a new commune named Tân An Hội (Clause 124, Article 1).
