= North–South express railway =

Proposed high-speed train service in Vietnam

North–South express railway (Vietnam)

Overview
- Status: Planned
- Owner: Vietnam Railway Corporation
- Locale: Vietnam
- Termini: Ngọc Hồi Station (Hanoi); Thủ Thiêm station (Ho Chi Minh City)
- Stations: 30 stations (25 passenger stations, 5 cargo stations)

Service
- System: High Speed Railway (HSR)
- Route number: ĐSCTBN
- Operator: Vietnam Railways
- Depot(s): 10 depots (5 large depots: Huu Nghi, Ngoc Hoi, Da Nang, Long Thanh, Trung Luong – 5 small depots: Bắc Giang, Hà Tĩnh, Nha Trang, My Thuan, Hậu Giang)

Technical
- Line length: 2,070 km (1,290 mi)
- Number of tracks: Double-track
- Character: Elevated
- Track gauge: 1,435 mm (4 ft 8 1/2 in) standard gauge
- Electrification: 25 kV 60 Hz overhead lines (AC)
- Operating speed: 350 km/h (220 mph)
- Signalling: ETCS Level 2

The North–South express railway (Vietnamese: Đường sắt cao tốc Bắc-Nam) is a planned high speed railway in Vietnam. The line would begin in Thanh Trì and end in Thủ Đức, connecting the two most urbanised areas in the country: Hanoi in the North, and Ho Chi Minh City in the South. This project is part of the country's railway transport development strategy by 2020 with a vision to 2050. The project is also part of the Trans-Asian Railway network. Vietnam's National Assembly approved the $67 billion railway in November 2024.

== Background ==
Vietnam is a country with a relatively complete and early railway system in the Southeast Asia region. With motorization in the last few decades, the railway network has stagnated, with minimal expansion and even some trackage dismantled.

The north–south topography of the country would lend itself well for a north–south railway backbone. Currently, there is a lack of transport infrastructure along this north–south corridor – traveling the 1700 km from Hanoi to Ho Chi Minh City takes over 30 hours by conventional rail and by intercity bus, and around 2 hours by air. Hanoi–Ho Chi Minh City is one of the world's busiest flight routes, used by 11 million passengers in 2023 with over 60 daily flights.

With the ever-increasing demands placed on existing transportation networks, traffic congestion occurs throughout the system, decreasing the system's safety and having negative impacts on regional economic development, national productivity, and environmental quality.

With a high-speed railway, the North–South express railway project is expected to:

1. Reduce congestion and increase traffic safety;
2. Improve intercity transportation in Vietnam by making the full use of Vietnam's linear geographical advantages suited for a railway corridor to improve connectivity of the transport system in Vietnam.
3. Play the main role as the backbone of transport sector, contributing to the reduction of logistics expenses and enhancement of national competitiveness.
4. Promote nation-building for Vietnam's government.

=== Criticism ===
The project has been criticized by some Western news media sources for its enormous cost, which some have argued could be better spent on agriculture, education, electricity, and other transportation projects. In 2010, National Assembly deputy Nguyễn Minh Thuyết reportedly stated that the proposed cost, at the time, was equal to about 50 per cent of the country's gross domestic product, and that ordinary Vietnamese citizens would not be able to afford the high fares. Senior economist Pham Chi Lan, who described the proposal as "economically unsound", noted that it would not serve the 70% of Vietnamese citizens living in rural areas.

== History ==
=== First plan ===
The Japanese government, following the visit of Prime Minister Nguyễn Tấn Dũng to Japan in 2006, pledged to offer official development assistance for the project. The memorandum of understanding for the project (along with a related project, the North–South Expressway) was mutually signed by the two governments at that time. Construction was planned to start in 2010, and the high-speed railway will begin operation in 2020, according to the chairman of the Vietnam Railway Administration, Vu Xuan Hong. The initial cost was estimated at US$33 billion.

The total proposed length would be 1,570 km long, compared with the 1,726-kilometre (1,072 mi) of the existing conventional speed North–South railway, passing through 20 provinces and cities. The entire route has 27 stations and assuming 300 km/h (190 mph) top speeds an express stopping pattern will make the journey from Hanoi to Ho Chi Minh City in 5 hours and 38 minutes, stopping only at Vinh, Da Nang, Nha Trang stations. An all stop high speed service pattern will take 6 hours and 51 minutes from Hanoi to Ho Chi Minh City. Currently a trip by train between Hanoi and Ho Chi Minh City takes 32 hours.

With preliminary topographical and geological surveillance already carried out by a joint Japanese-Vietnamese team, two sections of the railway—the 295-kilometre (183 mi) Hanoi–Vinh section and the 362-kilometre (225 mi) Ho Chi Minh City–Nha Trang section—were initially slated for implementation in stages between 2011 and 2015, with the implementation of the remaining Vinh–Nha Trang section starting in 2020. The whole line was scheduled to open by 2035.

The express line would be built as a double-track standard gauge (1,435 mm (4 ft 8 1/2 in)) line, with a design speed of 300 kilometres per hour (190 mph) compared with the existing North–South Railway line which was metre gauge (1,000 mm (3 ft 3 3/8 in)) sometimes single track with an average speed of 50 kilometres per hour (31 mph). Japanese Shinkansen bullet train technology was proposed for use on this line; its technology—and its actual geographical track—would be completely independent of the existing North–South railway line. In April 2010, Kawasaki Heavy Industries Mitsubishi Heavy Industries, Mitsubishi Corp., Sumitomo Corp., and other Japanese companies had asked the Ministry of Transport (MOT) to formally adopt their bullet train technology for the development of the project, which the Vietnam government agreed to, if the project were approved.

On June 19, 2010, after a month of deliberations, National Assembly of Vietnam (NAV) rejected the current high-speed rail proposal, reportedly due to the US$56 billion cost involved. National Assembly members are said to have asked for further study of the project. Shuji Eguchi, a director at the Japanese Transport Ministry's railway bureau, noted in an August 2010 interview that the proposed railway needed a "step-by-step approach", that Vietnam's conventional rail network was "single track and not electrified yet" and that the government needed to "train personnel and enact necessary legislation".

August 2010, the MOT confirmed that plans for the express railway were on hold pending further research. At that time, Nguyen Huu Bang, the chairman and CEO of national railway company Vietnam Railways, stated that the government was expected to resubmit the project after new leaders of the Communist Party are selected in 2011, and that the Japan International Cooperation Agency (JICA) would likely be asked to examine the feasibility of two priority sections from Hanoi to Vinh and from Ho Chi Minh City to Nha Trang. In September 2010, the proposal was again reviewed and a detailed study was started by the JICA. The project would be funded from the State budget and JICA to conduct a study from May 2011 to March 2013. After a meeting with the MOT in October 2010, Deputy Prime Minister Hoàng Trung Hải was reported to have authorized the reception of Japanese technical assistance for those two sections.

=== Second plan ===
In March 2013, the Japan International Cooperation Agency (JICA) submitted a report to concerned authorities for the development of the project creating a second plan for the North–South express railway. In October 2013, JICA suggested a proposed route for this initial Hanoi – Vinh section with an investment of US$10.2 billion. On the evaluation of JICA studies, the Vietnam Railways Corporation advised MOT and the government of Vietnam to approve JICA's scheme and build the proposed rail line. The project is planned to be implemented through public-private partnership (PPP) mode. However, the model is yet to be finalized. Siemens is appointed as the technology consultant for the project.

In June 2014, the MOT submitted a proposal to the federal government. In 2015 the government approved the development strategy for Vietnam's railway transport to 2020 and vision to 2050, targeting the development of railway infrastructure and the high-level management of transport and services.

In September 2016, the Ministry of Transport started updating three feasibility studies, which were submitted by the Japan Consultancy Joint Venture (JCJV), Korea International Cooperation Agency and the JICA in the year 2013. During October 2016, Hanoi General Export-Import JSC (Geleximco) and Hong Kong United Investors Holding (HUI) have expressed interest in co-developing the project and are waiting for the approval from the Ministry of Transport.

On June 16, 2017, the National Assembly officially approved the Revised Railway Laws which supplements many preferential and breakthrough mechanisms and policies.

In November 2017, Prime Minister Nguyễn Xuân Phúc announced that the Ministry of Transport's final plan for the express railway system will be completed and submitted to the National Assembly's consideration in 2019. The Assembly will then hold a final vote on whether to approve or reject funding for the project.

The consortium at a conference on November 12, 2018, chaired by the MOT, said that the ratio of private investment is reasonable after they referred to investment models in Japan, France, China, and Taiwan. Speaking at the meeting, some experts said that the cost of US$38 million for a kilometer of express railway is too high in comparison with US$27 million in China and US$26 million in Spain. Deputy Minister of Transport Nguyen Ngoc Dong said that the rate in Vietnam is high due to site clearance and a lack of expertise and technologies. The MOT's representatives said that the express railway, which is designed to operate at the speed of 200-320 kilometers/hour, is able to compete with aviation but safer. But the experts cared for the internal rate of return (IRR) of the costly project. Reports at the event showed that the IRR would range from 8.9% to 10.6% if the fare is equal to 50% and 100% of air tickets of economy class, respectively. But no data of transport capacity and demand for the express railway has mentioned. Construction activities on the first phase were expected to commence in 2020 and the whole project is scheduled for completion in 2050.

By 2022, the MOT is still in the process of reviewing studies in order to complete the pre-feasibility study for the project and was planning to submit the pre-feasibility study report to the Government so that it could be passed to the National Assembly for approval. The ministry's plan suggests the first two sections of the railway, which would have a combined length of 665 kilometers and require an investment of US$24.72 billion to be scheduled to open by 2032. The Ministry previously said it hopes to begin construction of the first sections by 2028. The entire project is slated to be completed by 2045–2050.

By 2023, the government is still seeking to make a decision on either a passenger-only high-speed railway (350 km/h), a mixed-use higher-speed rail (200–250 km/h) or a mixed-use high-speed railway. This would include upgrades to the existing railway. All options would have a cost around US$70 billion.

=== Shift to China ===
In April 2024, in a pivot to China, Vietnam is seeking to learn from China to develop the North–South high-speed railway. Vietnam's Minister of Planning and Investment Nguyen Chi Dung visited China to meet Chinese trade and transport officials as well as railway executives. Meetings with Japan on the possibility of funding and technical assistance continued in 2024.

In June 2024, Vietnam's Minister of Transport, Nguyen Van Thang announced a goal to start construction on the North–South High-Speed Railway, now with a design speed of 350 kilometres per hour (220 mph) before 2030 with a target completion date of 2035. Prime Minister Phạm Minh Chính, asked Chinese businesses to invest in developing Vietnam's rail sector and sought China's assistance in railway construction of the North–South high-speed railway as well as two additional high-speed railways connecting Hanoi and the North–South High-Speed Rail to the Chinese high-speed rail system, possibly starting construction in 2026 or 2027. The two new lines to China will form part of the North–South High-Speed Rail route. Vietnam's National Assembly chairman Vuong Dinh Hue met executives of Chinese railway companies and sought to learn from China to develop Vietnam's first high-speed railway network. In August 2024, the newly appointed President of Vietnam Tô Lâm met with the Chinese President and signed an agreement to enhance railway connectivity between China and Vietnam including the North–South High-Speed Rail. Vietnam has estimated the cost of building a new railway linking it with China's Yunnan province at US$7.2 billion (179 trillion dong), with construction starting in 2030.

=== Construction ===
In December 2025, the Ministry of Construction announced that the North–South high-speed railway will break ground by the end of 2026. Feasibility studies to construct a direct high-speed connection to China is also expected to be finalised in March that same year.

In September 2026, it was announced that construction is set to begin in December 2027.

== Sino-Japanese competition for infrastructure projects ==
According to a report by the Asia Development Bank (ADB), Southeast Asia needs US$1.7 trillion annually from 2016 to 2030 on infrastructure to maintain its growth momentum. In this context, Japan and China have increasingly emerged as regional technical and economic competitors, as evidenced by their rivalry for infrastructure projects through funding entities and large-scale technological systems across Southeast Asia as seen in Sino-Japanese competition for developing high-speed rail in Thailand and the recent completion of the Jakarta-Bandung High-speed Railway, Indonesia's first ever high speed railway, built using Chinese technical assistance.

In Vietnam, the first Ho Chi Minh City Metro is largely backed by funding and expertise from the Japanese governmental agency JICA as well as the engineering conglomerates Sumitomo, Shimizu and Maeda. The inaugural line of the Hanoi Metro, on the other hand, relies on support and technical expertise from a consortium of Chinese companies headed by the state-owned China Railways Sixth Group.

== List of stations ==
The following is a list of railway stations projected to be served by the railway.

- Ngoc Hoi (Ga Ngọc Hồi) in the Southern suburb of Hanoi, about 10 km from Hanoi railway station to start the construction in December 2027
- Phu Ly (Ga Phủ Lý) in Phủ Lý
- Nam Dinh (Ga Nam Định) in Nam Định
- Ninh Binh (Ga Ninh Bình) in Hoa Lư
- Thanh Hoa (Ga Thanh Hóa) in Thanh Hóa
- Vinh (Ga Vinh) in Vinh, the end of first phase for the Northern section before starting the construction in 2028 with expected finish date in 2035.
- Ha Tinh (Ga Hà Tĩnh) in Hà Tĩnh
- Vung Ang (Ga Vũng Áng) in Vũng Áng, Kỳ Anh
- Dong Hoi (Ga Đồng Hới) in Đồng Hới
- Dong Ha (Ga Đông Hà) in Đông Hà
- Hue (Ga Huế) in Huế
- Da Nang (Ga Đà Nẵng) in Danang
- Tam Ky (Ga Tam Kỳ) in Tam Kỳ
- Quang Ngai (Ga Quảng Ngãi) in Quảng Ngãi
- Bong Son (Ga Bồng Sơn) in Bồng Sơn, Hoài Nhơn
- Dieu Tri (Ga Diêu Trì) in Diêu Trì (for Quy Nhơn)
- Tuy Hoa (Ga Tuy Hòa) in Tuy Hòa
- Dien Khanh (Ga Diên Khánh) in Diên Lạc (Diên Khánh district; for Nha Trang). The end of first phase for the Southern section before starting the construction in 2028 with expected finish date in 2035
- Thap Cham (Ga Tháp Chàm) in Phan Rang–Tháp Chàm
- Phan Ri (Ga Phan Rí) in Phan Rí Cửa
- Muong Man (Ga Mương Mán) in Hàm Kiệm (for Phan Thiết)
- Long Thanh (Ga Long Thành) at Long Thành International Airport
- Thu Thiem (Ga Thủ Thiêm) in An Phú, Thủ Đức (now is Bình Trưng), Ho Chi Minh City on the eastern bank of Saigon river, about 8 km from Bến Thành Market from the Ben Thanh station via Ho Chi Minh City Metro Line 2 or East–West Highway (through the Thủ Thiêm Tunnel), to start the construction in December 2027

== See also ==
- Transport in Vietnam
- Rail transport in Vietnam
- Ho Chi Minh City–Cần Thơ express railway

== Sources ==
- Del Testa, David Willson (2001), Paint the Trains Red: Labor, Nationalism, and the Railroads in French Colonial Indochina, 1898—1945, Ph.D. Dissertation, University of California, Davis.
- Deutsch, Karl Wolfgang & Folt, William J., eds (1966), Nation Building in Comparative Contexts, New York, Atherton.
- Doling, Tim (2012), The Railways and Tramways of Việt Nam, Bangkok: White Lotus Press.
- Le, T. V., Zhang, J., Chikaraishi, M., & Fujiwara, A. (2018), Influence of introducing high-speed railways on intercity travel behavior in Vietnam, arXiv preprint arXiv:1810.00155
- Mylonas, Harris (2017),"Nation-building," Oxford Bibliographies in International Relations. Ed. Patrick James. New York: Oxford University Press.
