= Củ Chi district =

Củ Chi district Huyện Củ Chi
- District
- Position in metropolitan area of HCMC

- Location within Vietnam
- Coordinates: 11°02′17″N 106°30′20″E
- Country: Vietnam
- Centrally governed city: Ho Chi Minh City
- Seat: Quarter 7, Củ Chi Town
- Divisions: 1 township, 20 communes

Area
  - Total: 435 km^{2} (168 sq mi)

Population (2018)
  - Total: 403,038
  - Density: 927/km^{2} (2,400/sq mi)

Demographics
  - Main ethnic groups: predominantly Kinh
- Time zone: UTC+07 (ICT)
- Website: cuchi.hochiminhcity.gov.vn

Củ Chi is a former rural district of Ho Chi Minh City, Vietnam.

== Etymology ==
The Vietnamese word Củ Chi ([kʊw˨˩˦ cɪj˧˧], koo-chi) is derived from the old Mon-Khmer words Tonle Sre (ទន្លេស្រែ, "river of rice-field") or Sre (ស្រែ "rice field").

== Geography ==
Cu Chi District is located in the northwest of Ho Chi Minh City, approximately 33 km from the city center. The Saigon River flows through the eastern part of the district, forming a boundary between Ho Chi Minh City and Binh Duong Province. The district's geographical location is as follows:

- To the east, it borders the cities of Thu Dau Mot and Thuan An in Binh Duong Province via the Saigon River.
- To the west, it borders Trang Bang Town in Tay Ninh Province and Duc Hoa District in Long An Province.
- To the south, it borders Duc Hoa District in Long An Province and Hoc Mon District in Ho Chi Minh City.
- To the north, it borders Ben Cat City and Dau Tieng District in Binh Duong Province via the Saigon River.

The district covers an area of 434.77 km^{2}, with a population of 462,047 people in 2019. The population density is 1,063 people per km^{2}.

Cu Chi District lies in the transitional region between the Mekong Delta and the Southeastern region, with elevations gradually decreasing in the northwest, southeast, northeast, and southwest directions. The average elevation above sea level is between 8 m and 10 m.

== History ==
During the Nguyễn dynasty, Củ Chi belonged to Bình Dương District, Tân Bình Prefecture, Phiên An Province. In 1841, it became part of Bình Long District, Tân Bình Prefecture, Gia Định Province (Bình Long District was formed from a portion of Bình Dương District).

In 1911, Củ Chi was merged into Hóc Môn District, Gia Định Province. By 1957, the Republic of Vietnam government separated a part of Hóc Môn District to establish Củ Chi District, under Bình Dương Province, with its district capital located in Tân An Hội Commune.

In 1963, when Hậu Nghĩa Province was established, Củ Chi District was divided into two parts. One half retained the name Củ Chi and became part of Hậu Nghĩa Province, while the other half became Phú Hòa District, remaining under Bình Dương Province. In 1973, Tân Thông Hội Commune was established from a portion of Tân An Hội Commune.

After April 30, 1975, Củ Chi District of Hậu Nghĩa Province was merged with Phú Hòa District of Bình Dương Province to form Củ Chi District, which became part of Ho Chi Minh City. On February 1, 1985, Củ Chi Town was established by separating a portion of land from Tân An Hội Commune, becoming the administrative center of the district.

== Administration ==
The district consists of one eponymous town, also the district capital, with 20 communes of:

- Phú Hòa Đông
- Tân Thạnh Đông
- Tân Thạnh Tây
- Tân An Hội
- Tân Thông Hội
- Trung An
- Phước Vĩnh An
- Hòa Phú
- Thái Mỹ
- Phước Thạnh
- An Phú
- Trung Lập Thượng
- Nhuận Đức
- Phạm Văn Cội
- Bình Mỹ
- Phước Hiệp
- Trung Lập Hạ
- Tân Phú Trung
- Phú Mỹ Hưng
- An Nhơn Tây

== See also ==
- Củ Chi tunnels
