= Bình Trưng, Ho Chi Minh City =

Bình Trưng Phường Bình Trưng Giồng Ông Tố
- Ward
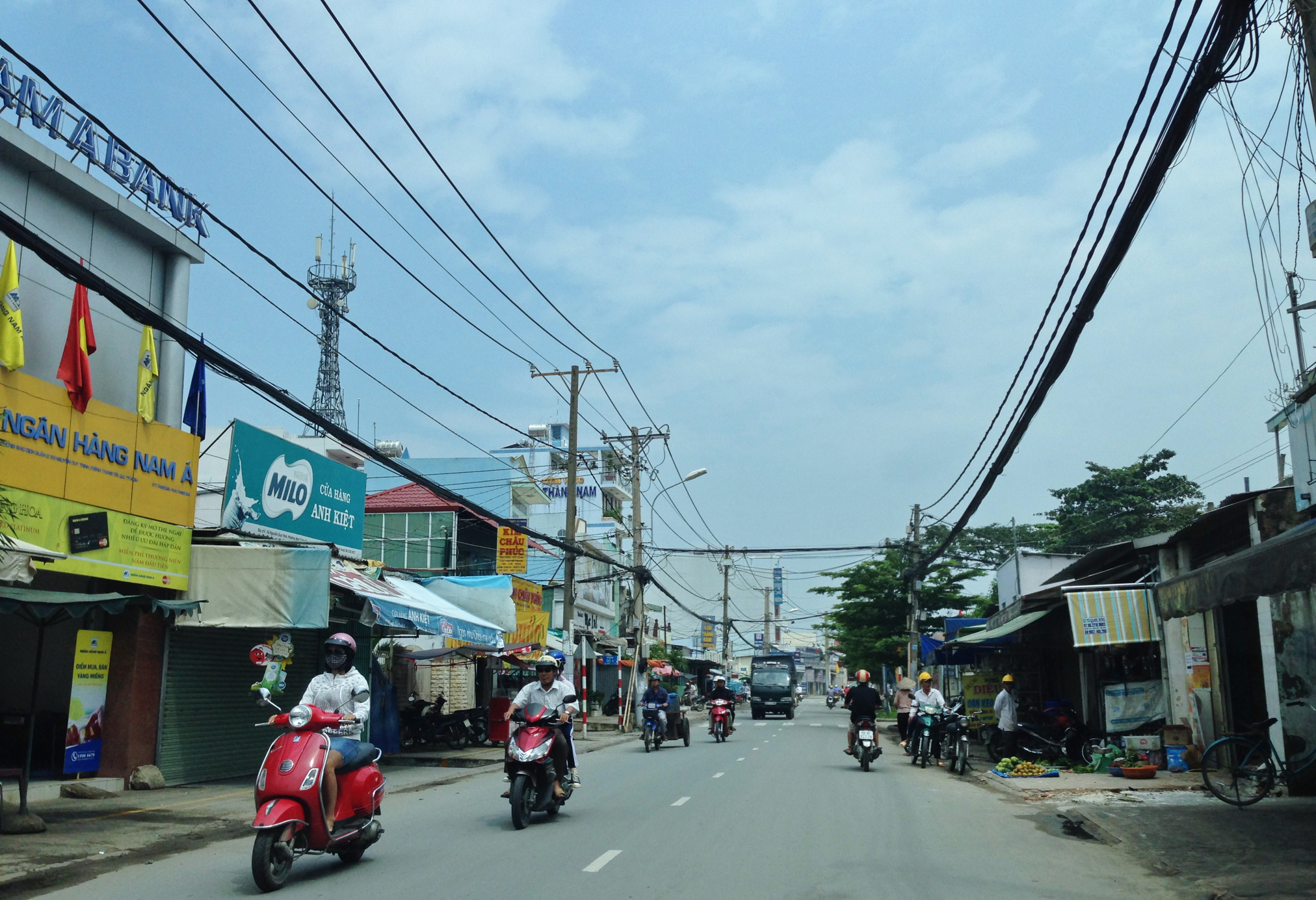
- Nguyễn Duy Trinh Road in Bình Trưng
- Interactive map of Bình Trưng
- Coordinates: 10°46′59″N 106°45′17″E
- Country: Vietnam
- Municipality: Ho Chi Minh City
- Established: June 16, 2025

Government
  - Type: Ward level authority

Area
  - Total: 5.72 sq mi (14.82 km^{2})

Population (2024)
  - Total: 121,382
  - Density: 21,210/sq mi (8,190/km^{2})
- Time zone: UTC+07:00 (Indochina Time)
- Administrative code: 27097

Bình Trưng (Vietnamese: Phường Bình Trưng) is a ward of Ho Chi Minh City, Vietnam. It is one of the 168 new wards, communes and special zones of the city following the reorganization in 2025.

== Geography ==
Bình Trưng is located in what used to be the southwest of Thủ Đức city, it is 8 kilometers east of Saigon ward. It borders the following wards:

- To the west, it borders An Khánh
- To the southwest, it borders Tân Thuận
- To the south, it borders Cát Lái
- To the north and northwest, it borders Phước Long
- To the southeast, it borders Long Trường

According to Official Dispatch No. 2896/BNV-CQĐP dated May 27, 2025 of the Ministry of Home Affairs, following the merger, Bình Trưng has a land area of 14.82 km², the population as of December 31, 2024 is 121,382 people, the population density is 8,190 people/km².

== History ==
On June 16, 2025, the National Assembly Standing Committee issued Resolution No. 1685/NQ-UBTVQH15 on the arrangement of commune-level administrative units of Ho Chi Minh City in 2025 (effective from June 16, 2025). Accordingly, the entire land area and population of Bình Trưng Đông, Bình Trưng Tây wards and part of An Phú ward of the former Thủ Đức city will be integrated into a new ward named Bình Trưng (Clause 76, Article 1).

== Education ==
=== Schools ===
- The American School, Song Hành/6 ĐCT
- Australian International School Thủ Thiêm campus, 264 Mai Chí Thọ
- Deutsche Schule HCMC – The International German School (IGS), 12 Võ Trường Toản Street
- Giồng Ông Tố High School, 10 Nguyễn Thị Định
- An Phú Primary School, 2 Đ. Số 3
