= Opera House station (Ho Chi Minh City) =

Metro station in Ho Chi Minh City

L1 02 Opera House Nhà hát Thành phố
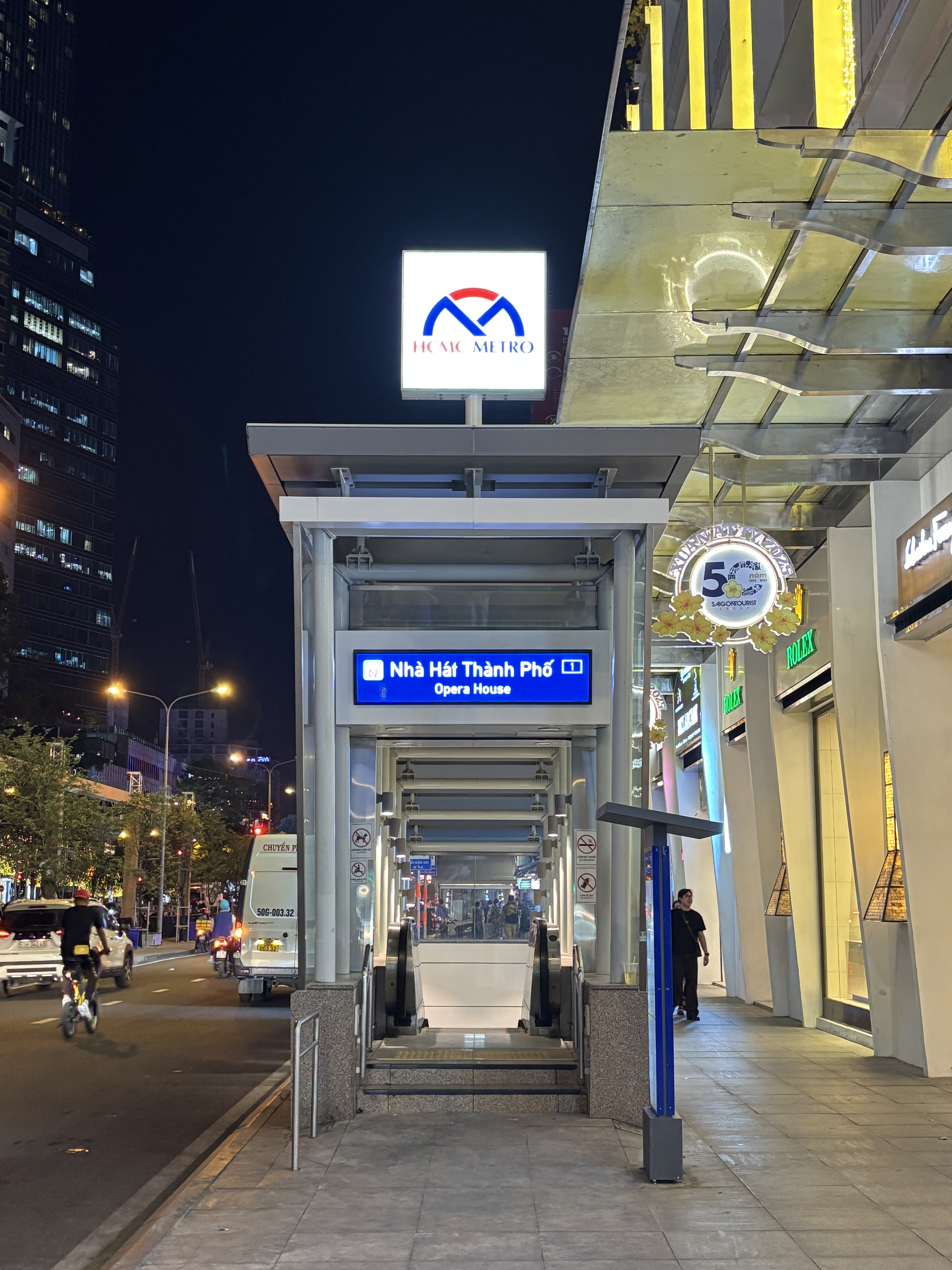
- Entrance 1 of the station next to Rex Arcade of Rex Hotel on Lê Lợi Boulevard at night

General information
- Location: Bến Nghé, District 1, Ho Chi Minh City, Vietnam
- System: Ho Chi Minh City Metro station
- Line: L1
- Bus routes: 155, DL01, DL02

Construction
- Structure type: Underground

Other information
- Status: Completed

History
- Opened: 22 December 2024

Services
Preceding station	Ho Chi Minh City Metro	Following station
Ben Thanh L1 01 Terminus	Line 1	Ba Son L1 03 towards Suoi Tien Terminal
Route map
Location

Opera House station (Vietnamese: Ga Nhà hát Thành phố) is an underground Ho Chi Minh City Metro station on Line 1. Built in front of the Lam Sơn Square, Municipal Theatre of Ho Chi Minh City, underneath Lê Lợi Boulevard, the station opened on 22 December 2024.

== Station layout ==
GF	Ground Floor	Entrances/Exits
B1F	1st Floor	Ticket sales area, commercial area, platform gates & ticket gates
B2F	Side platform, doors will open on the right
B2F	Platform 1	← L1 Line 1 to Ben Thanh (Terminus) Transfer to L2 Line 2 or L4 Line 4 on the next station
B3F	3rd Floor	Technical department area
B4F	Side platform, doors will open on the left
B4F	Platform 2	L1 Line 1 to Ba Son (for Suoi Tien Terminal) →

== Surrounding area ==
The station is under Lê Lợi Boulevard, stretch from Pasteur Street, crosses the City Hall and Nguyễn Huệ Boulevard at the "Willow Round-a-bout" (Bùng binh Cây Liễu) and to the Saigon Opera House at Đồng Khởi Street. The area around the station is known as one of the most appealing area of the city with many most well-known buildings here, included:

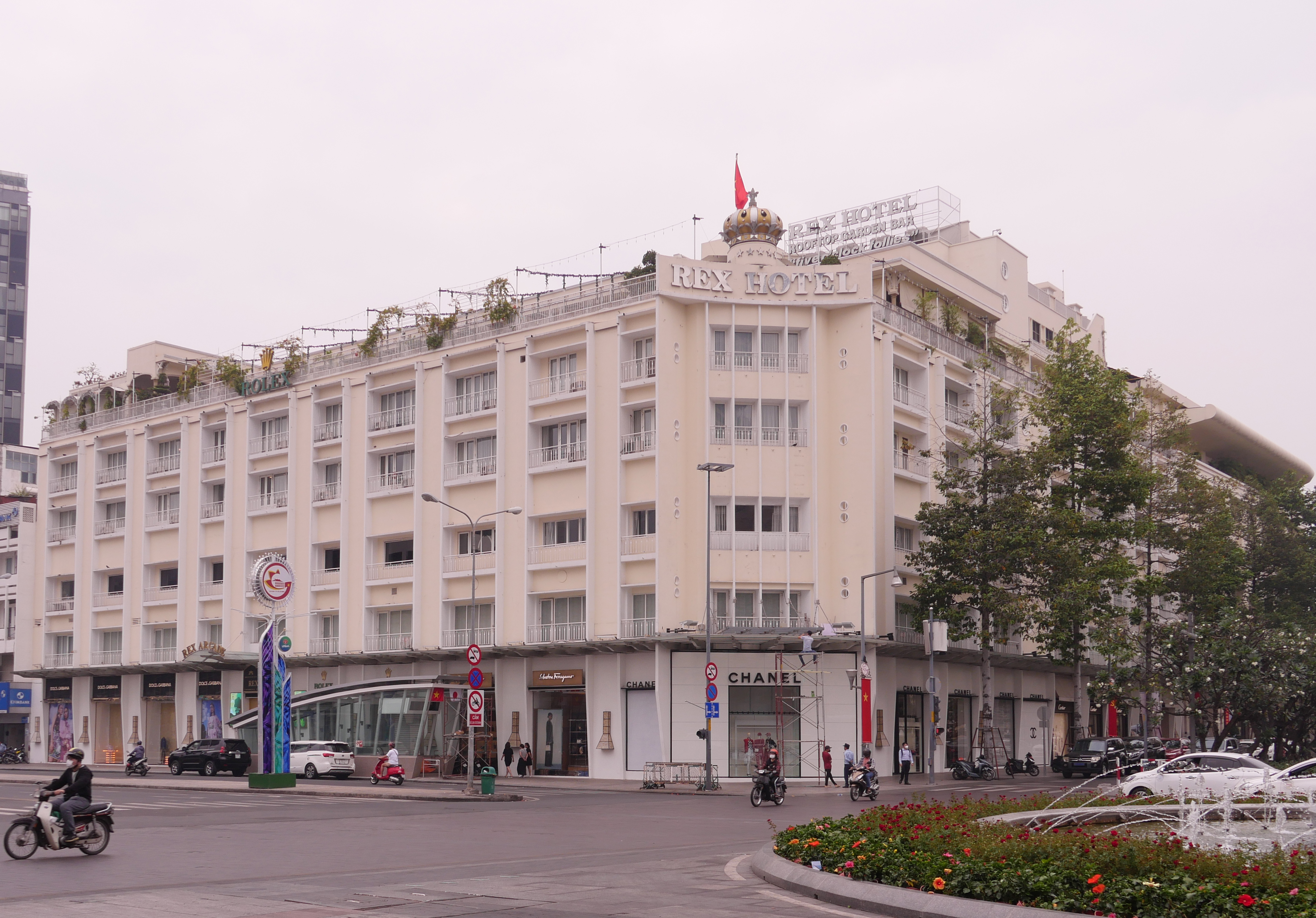
The "Willow roundabout" with Entrance 1 of the station next to Rex Hotel

- Ho Chi Minh City Hall
- Saigon Opera House (opposite Gate 5)
- Lam Sơn Square and Park (directly connected to Gate 5)
- Chi Lăng Park
- Sri Thendayuthapani Temple, Ho Chi Minh City (Chùa Ông Ấn Độ)
- General Sciences Library of Ho Chi Minh City
- Museum of Ho Chi Minh City
- Rex Hotel / Rex Arcade (next to Gate 1)
- Caravelle Hotel
- Hotel Continental Saigon
- Park Hyatt Saigon
- Sheraton Saigon Grand Opera Hotel
- Artex Saigon Opera View Building
- Sunwah Tower
- Vincom Center Đồng Khởi
- Saigon Union Square / Mandarin Oriental, Saigon (hotel is under construction; previously was the place of Passage Eden Mall, directly connected to Gate 4 at underground floor)
- Saigon Centre (opposite Gate 3 on Pasteur Street)
- Saigon Tax Trade Centre (demolished; wait for renovation, next to Gate 3)
- Saigontourist Plaza (previously operated by Parkson)
- Oriental Diamond Complex Hotel
- 151 Đồng Khởi Art Arcade
- 26 Lý Tự Trọng Building
- 22 Gia Long Street
- Liberty Central Saigon Citypoint Hotel (opposite Entrance 2 at Pasteur - Lê Lợi intersection)
- SJC Tower (on hold; previously was the place of International Trade Center-ITC)

== Gallery ==
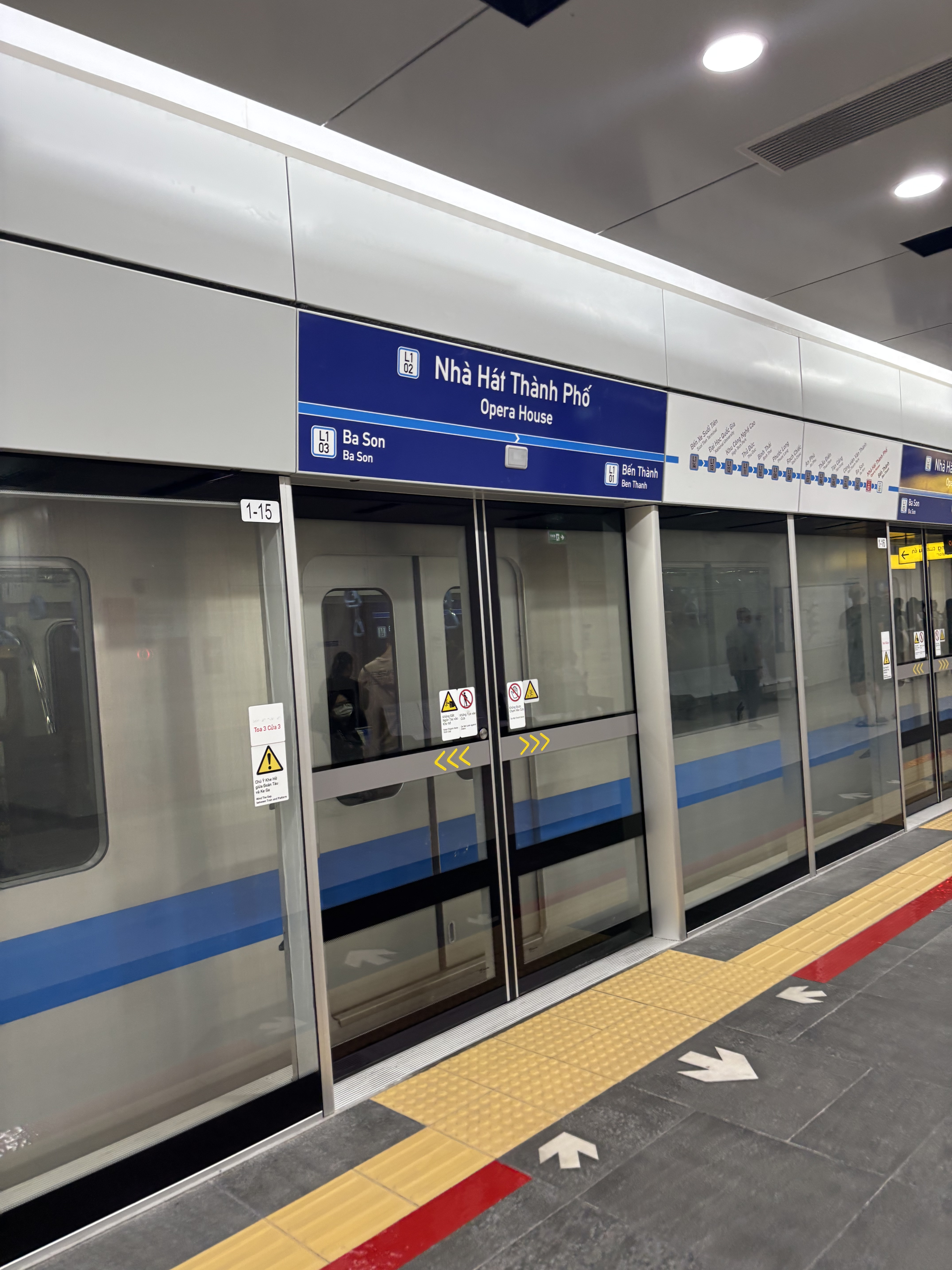
Platform 1

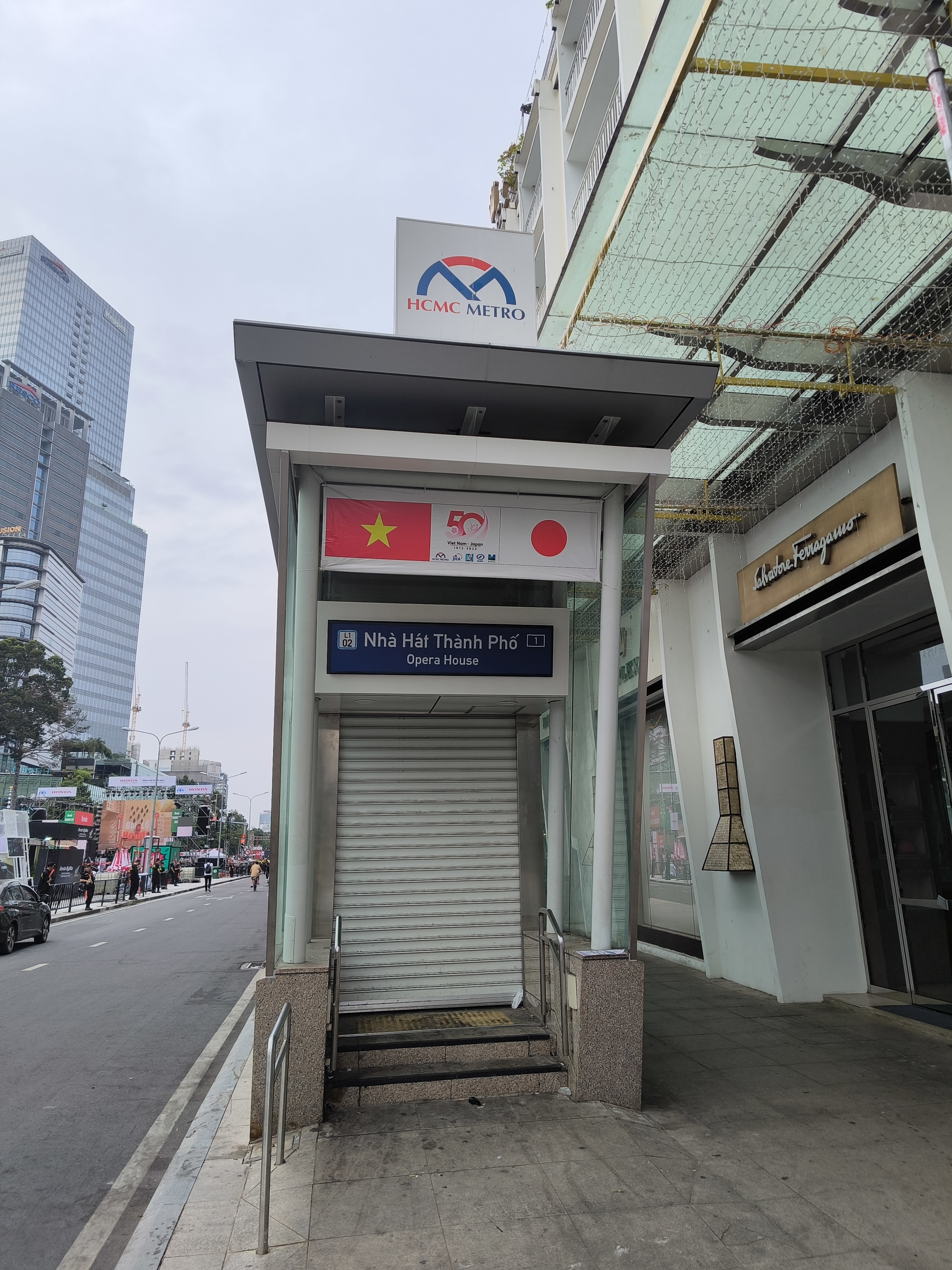
Entrance/Exit 1 a year before into operation

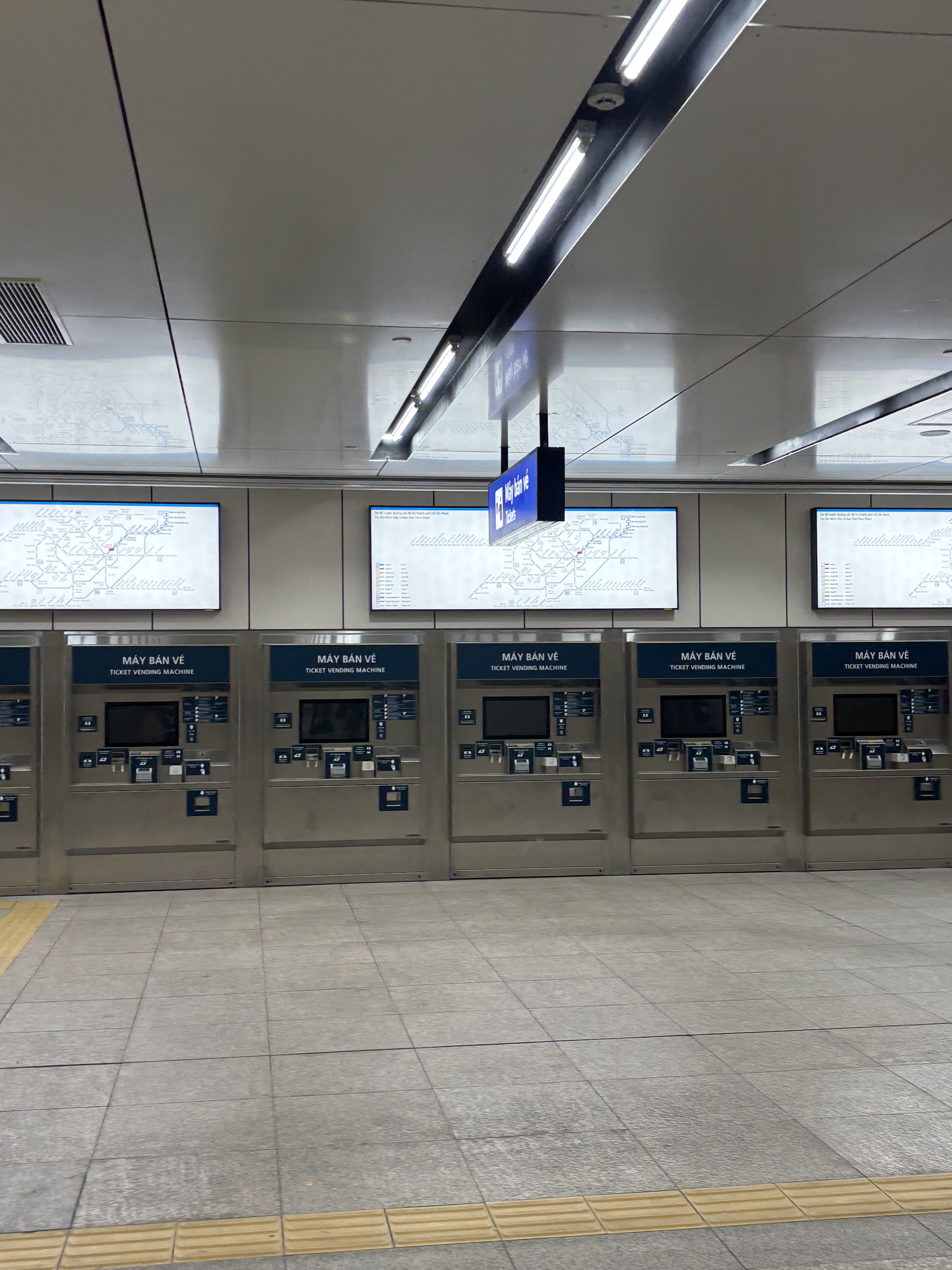
Ticket machine

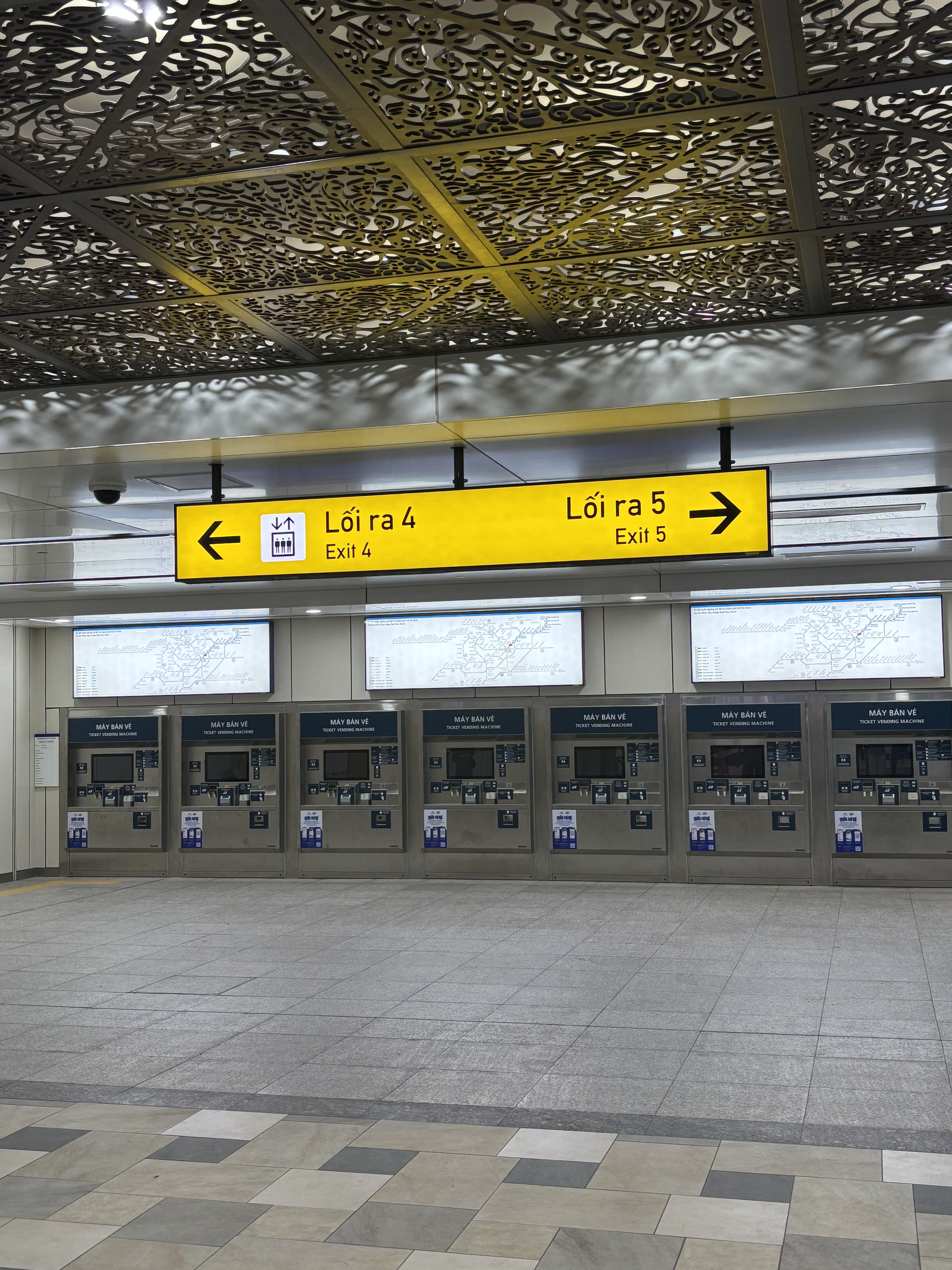
Ticket machine

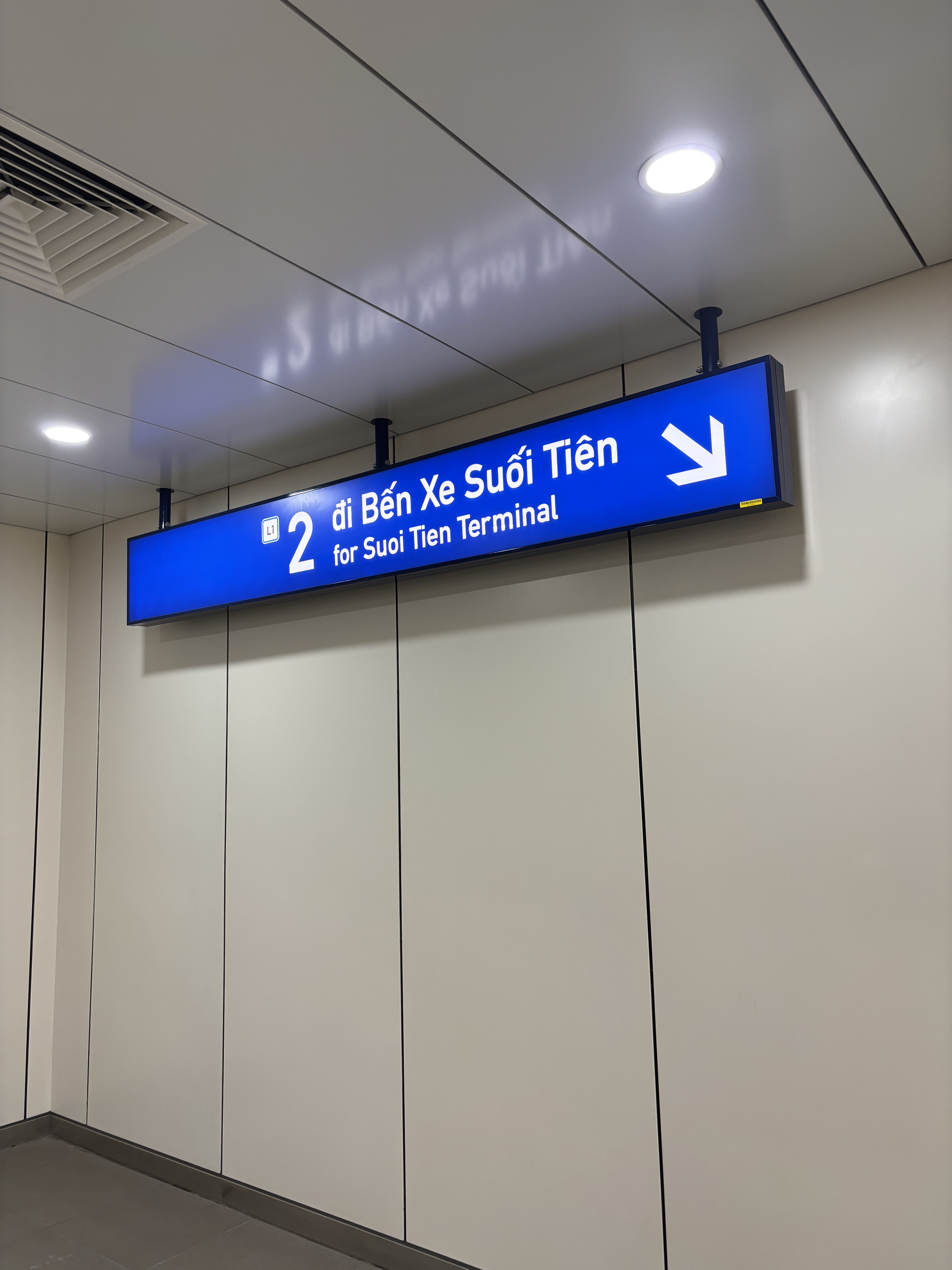
Head to Platform 2

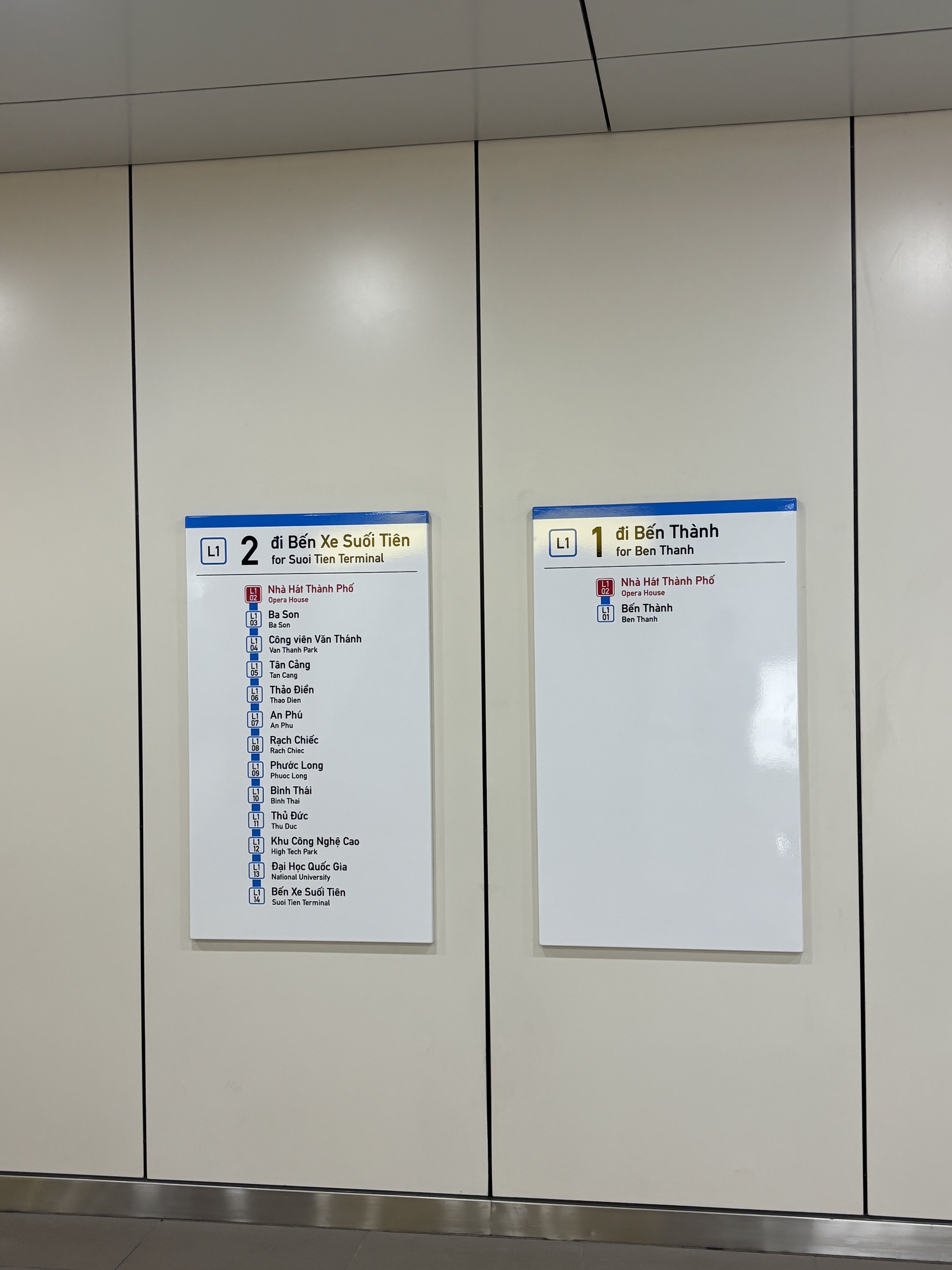
Ho Chi Minh City Metro Line 1 Route at Opera House Station B1 level

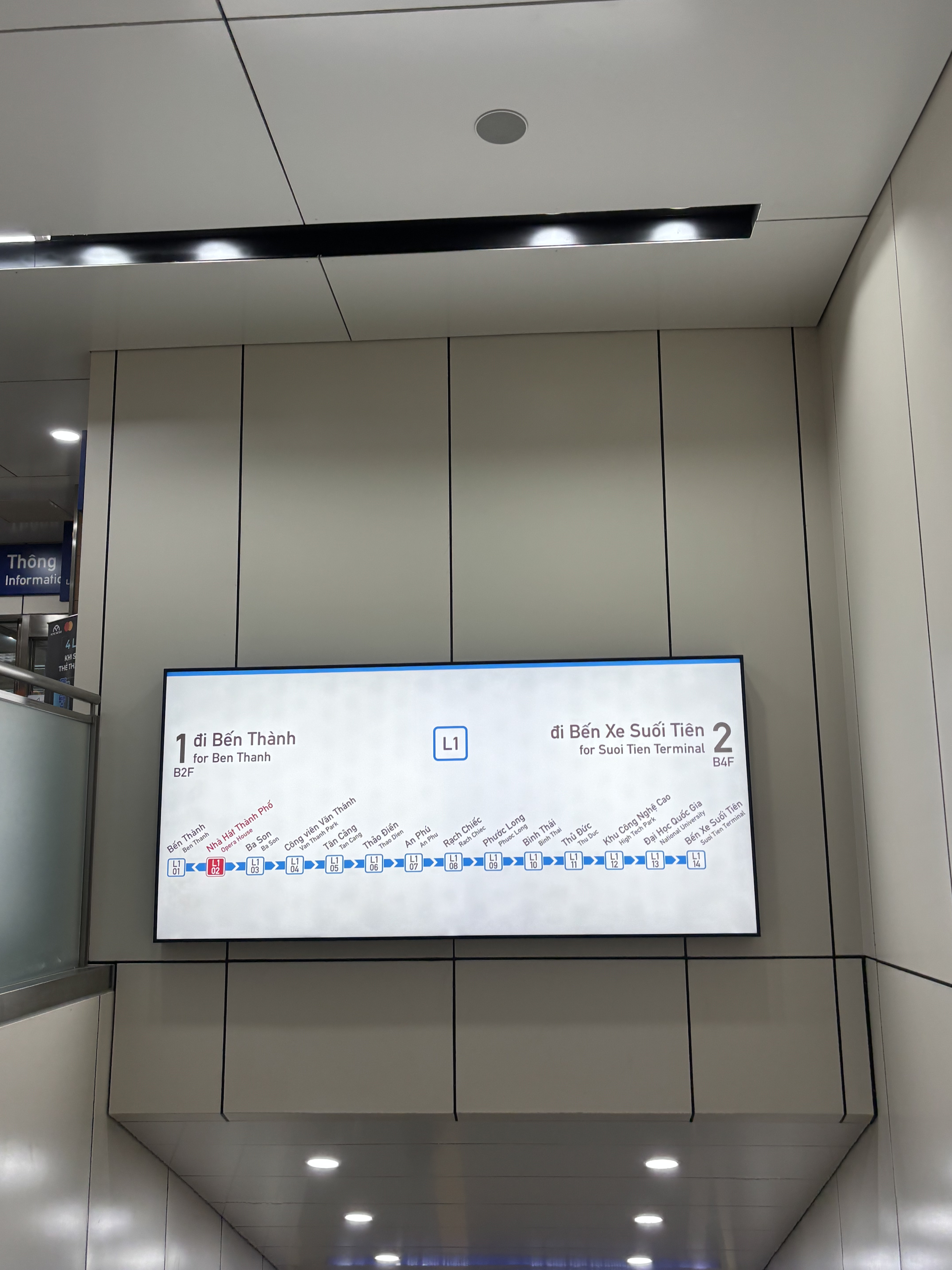
Ho Chi Minh City Metro Line 1 Route at Opera House Station B2 level

Café U at Level Lower 2 of Union Square Saigon connects with the Exit 4
