= Lam Sơn Square =

Urban square in central Ho Chi Minh City, Vietnam

- City square
- Công trường Lam Sơn
- Former names: Place du Théâtre, Place Augustin Foray
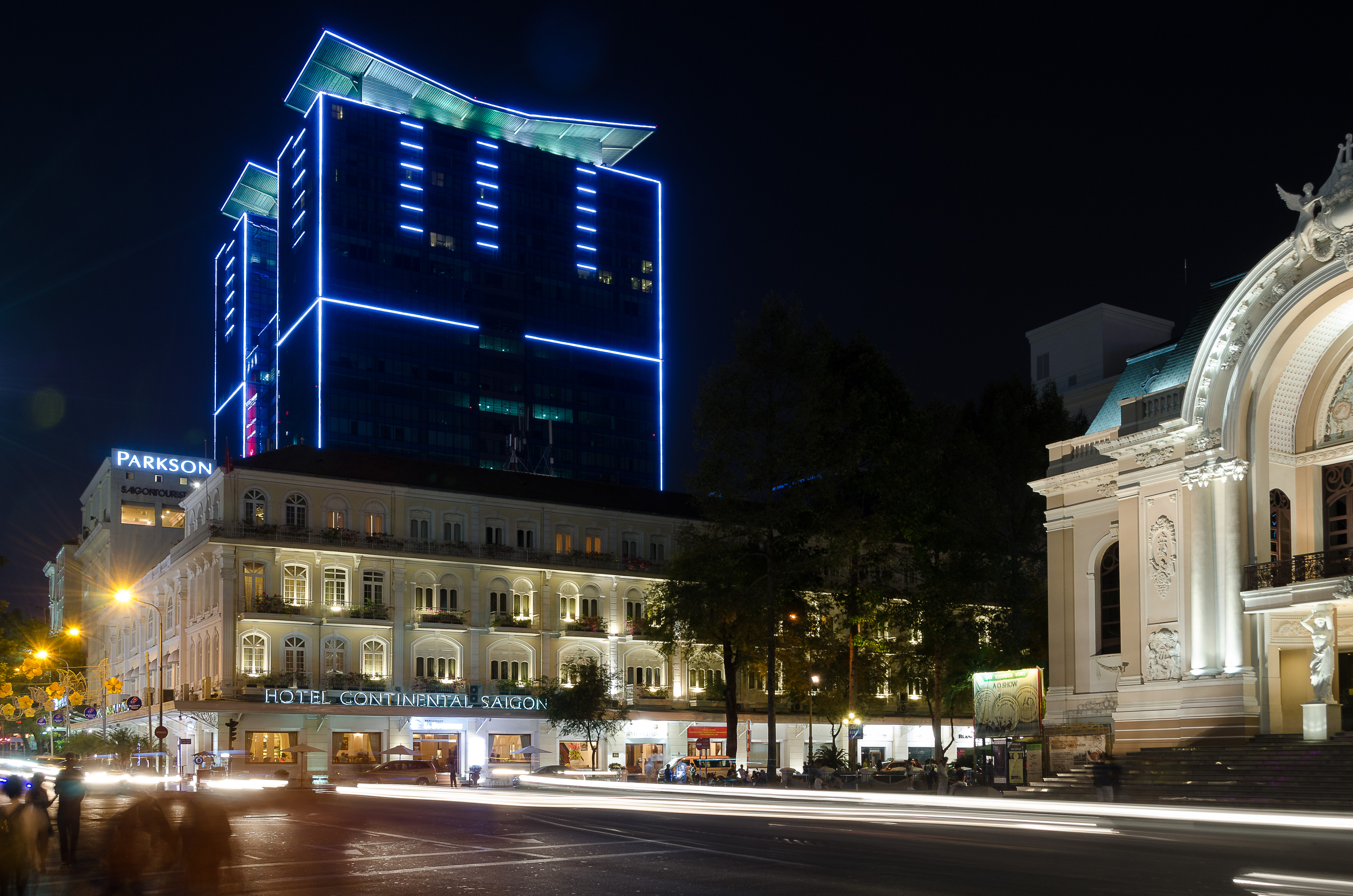
- Lam Son Square in 2015
- Named for: Lam Sơn uprising
- Owner: Ho Chi Minh City
- Location: Saigon, Ho Chi Minh City
- Public transit: L1 Opera House station
- Interactive map of Lam Sơn Square
- Coordinates: 10°46′35″N 106°42′11″E

Lam Sơn Square (Vietnamese: Công trường Lam Sơn) is the city square surrounding the Municipal Theatre of Ho Chi Minh City in Downtown Saigon, Ho Chi Minh City, Vietnam.

The square extends from Đồng Khởi Street to Hai Bà Trưng Street, although it is commonly known for its section in front of the Municipal Theatre's façade, Hotel Continental Saigon and Caravelle Hotel are located. The Opera House station of Ho Chi Minh City Metro Line 1 also located in the square side of Đồng Khởi Street. A landscape garden opposite the Opera House main gate on Lê Lợi Boulevard is Lam Sơn Park (Công viên Lam Sơn), it is also a part of the square.

== History ==
The site of the present-day Lam Sơn Square was originally the section of the boulevard Bonard (now Lê Lợi Boulevard) between the rue Catinat and rue Nationale (Đồng Khởi and Hai Bà Trưng Street nowadays, respectively). Following the completion of the Municipal Theatre, the square was known as place du Théâtre (Theatre Square), and it was not until 11 January 1935 that the official name, place Augustin Foray, was given after the former mayor of Saigon.

In 1955, place Augustin Foray was renamed Lam Sơn Square by the South Vietnamese government, and the Municipal Theatre became the National Assembly building.

Lam Sơn Square also housed the Brinks Hotel, the building used by the United States Army officers and was bombed by the Viet Cong in 1964. Today, the site is occupied by the Park Hyatt Saigon Hotel, and a memorial to the bombing was erected.

After Vietnam was reunified, the National Assembly building was restored to its original function as a theatre. The square's layout had little change until 2018, when the open space behind the theatre, previously used as a parking lot, was transformed into a landscaped garden.

== Lam Sơn Park ==
Lam Sơn Park (Vietnamese: Công viên Lam Sơn) is a landscape garden located directly in front of the Ho Chi Minh City Opera House at No. 7 Lam Sơn Square. It has an area of 2,200 m^{2} (24,000 sq ft) and was once dismantled to facilitate the construction of the Opera House Metro Station on Line 1, it was subsequently restored to its original size and layout, officially reopening in late August 2020. It currently serves as a public space and a frequent venue for photo exhibitions and major city commemorative events.

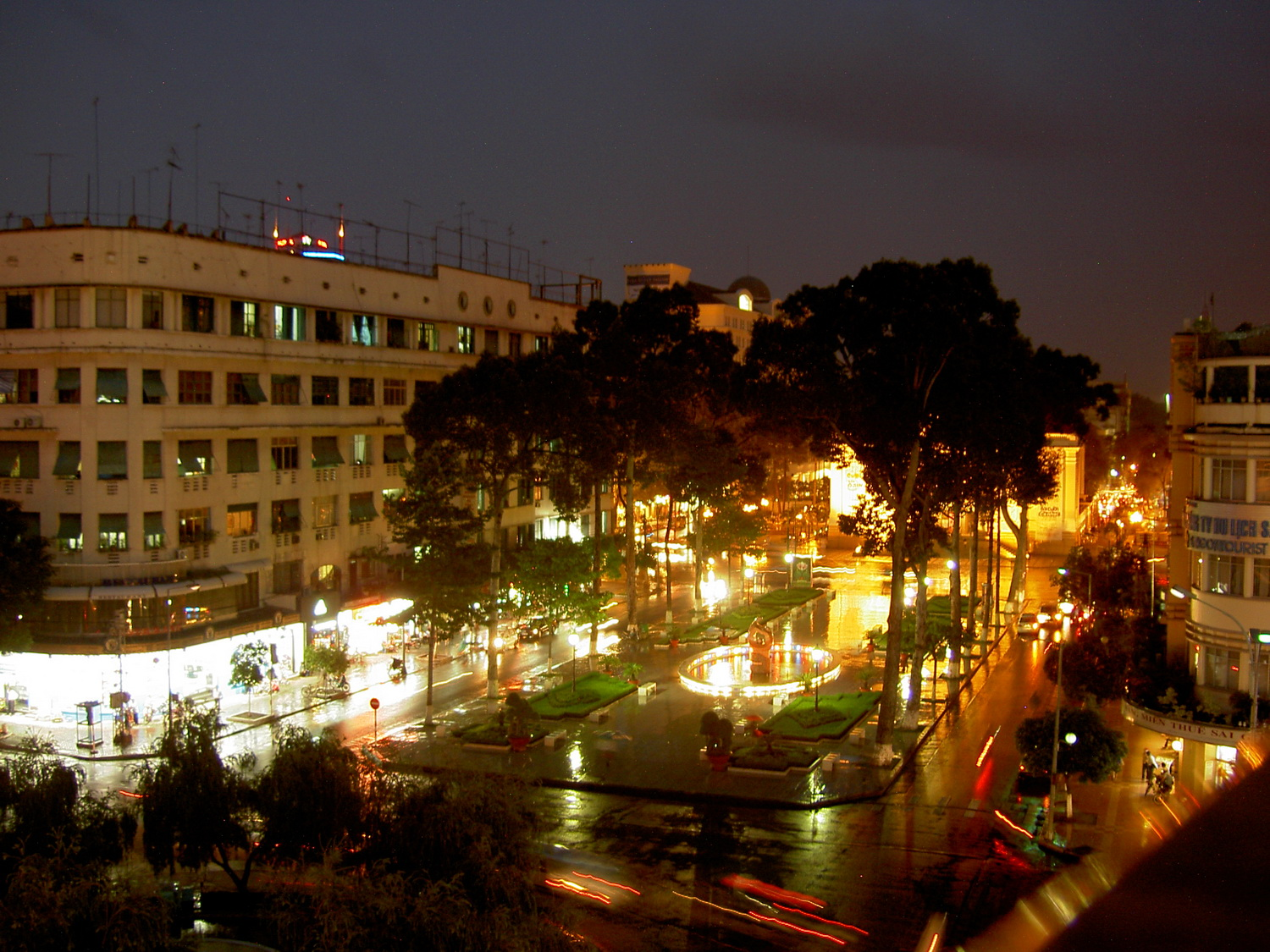
Lam Sơn Park viewed from Saigon Tax Trade Centre in 2001

Lam Sơn Park photo exhibition in 2009

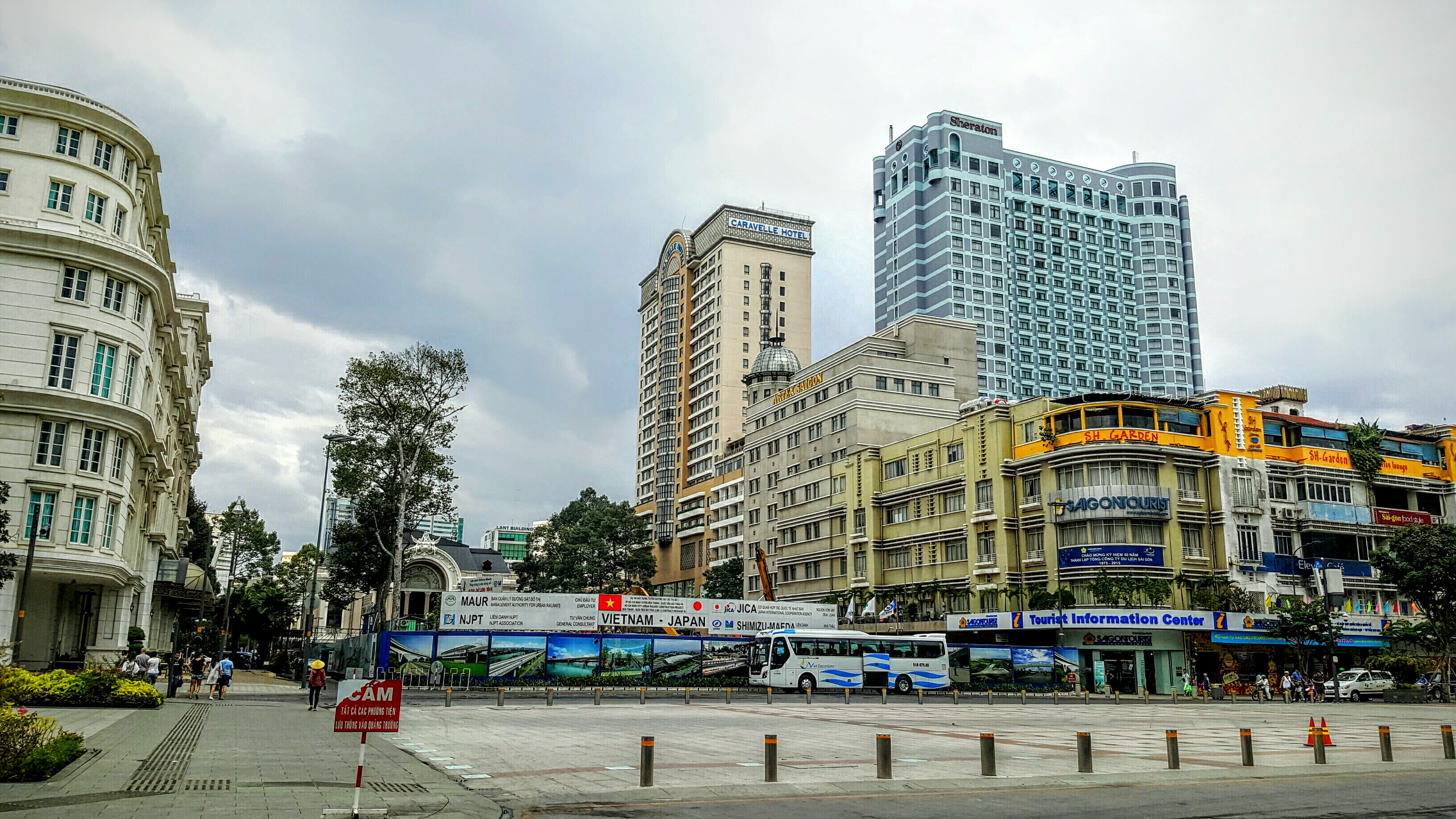
Lam Sơn Park viewed from Rex Hotel demolished for Line 1 construction in 2015

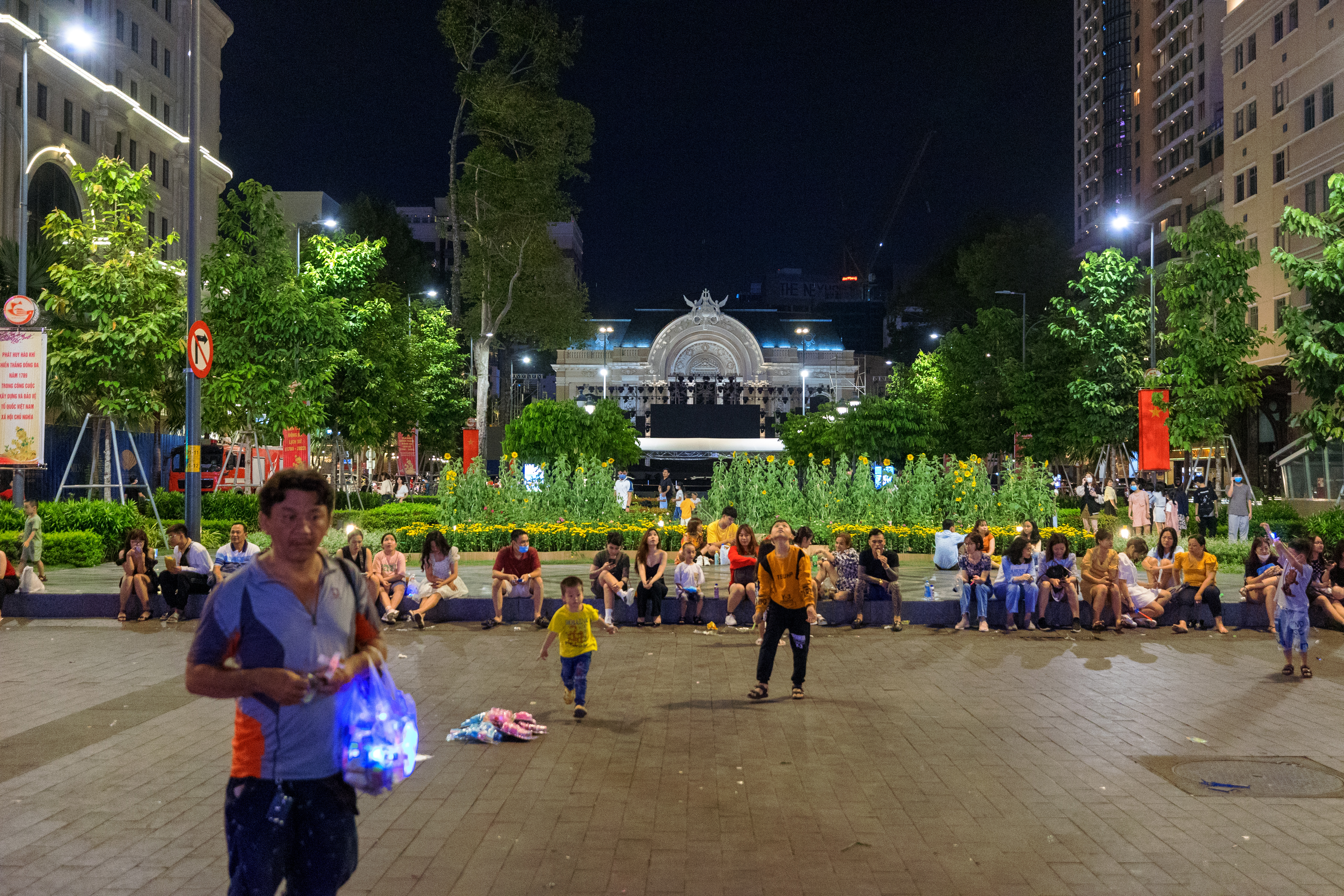
Lam Sơn Park in 2023 with Opera House in the back

Lam Sơn Park in 2024

== Buildings ==
List of buildings in the Lam Sơn Square (Only buildings surround the Opera House and between Đồng Khởi and Hai Bà Trưng Street):

Ho Chi Minh City Opera House, No. 7

Hotel Continental Saigon, 132–134 Đồng Khởi Street

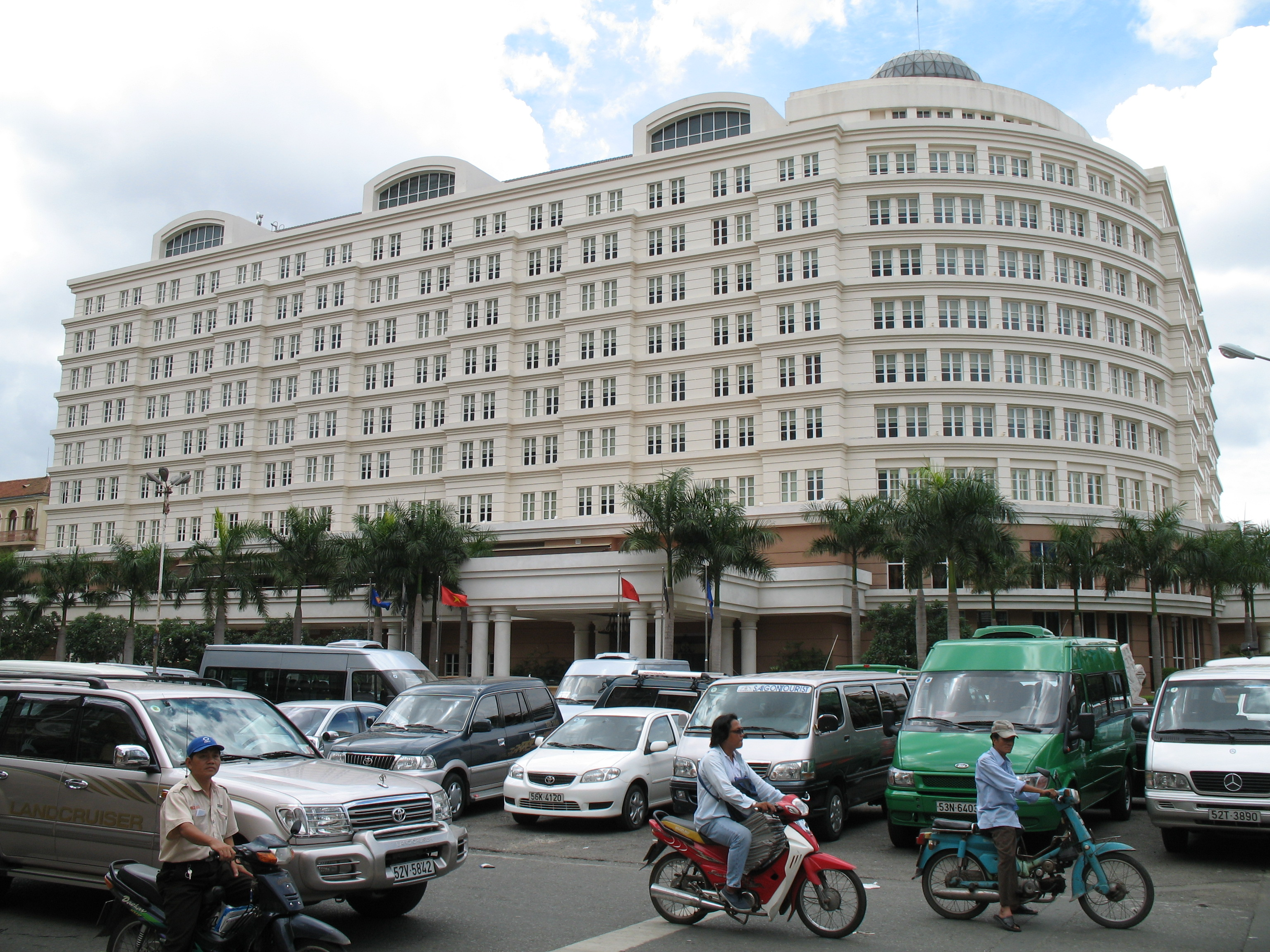
Park Hyatt Saigon, No. 1–2

Caravelle Hotel, No. 19–21–23

Hoằng Long and Lion Restaurants (closed), No. 11–13

No. 9 Lam Sơn Square Apartment with nearby buildings

== Gallery ==
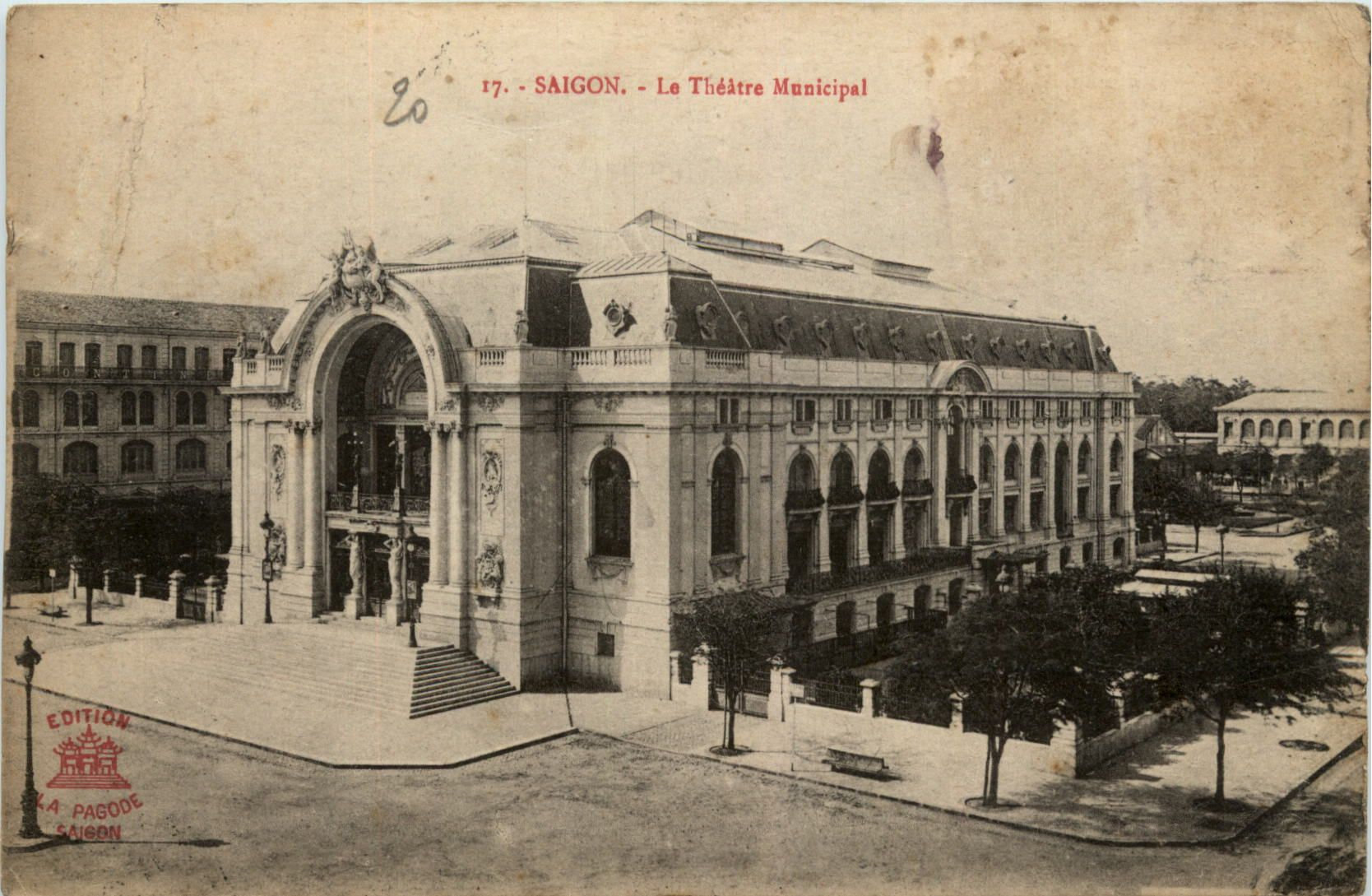
The Municipal Theatre of Saigon

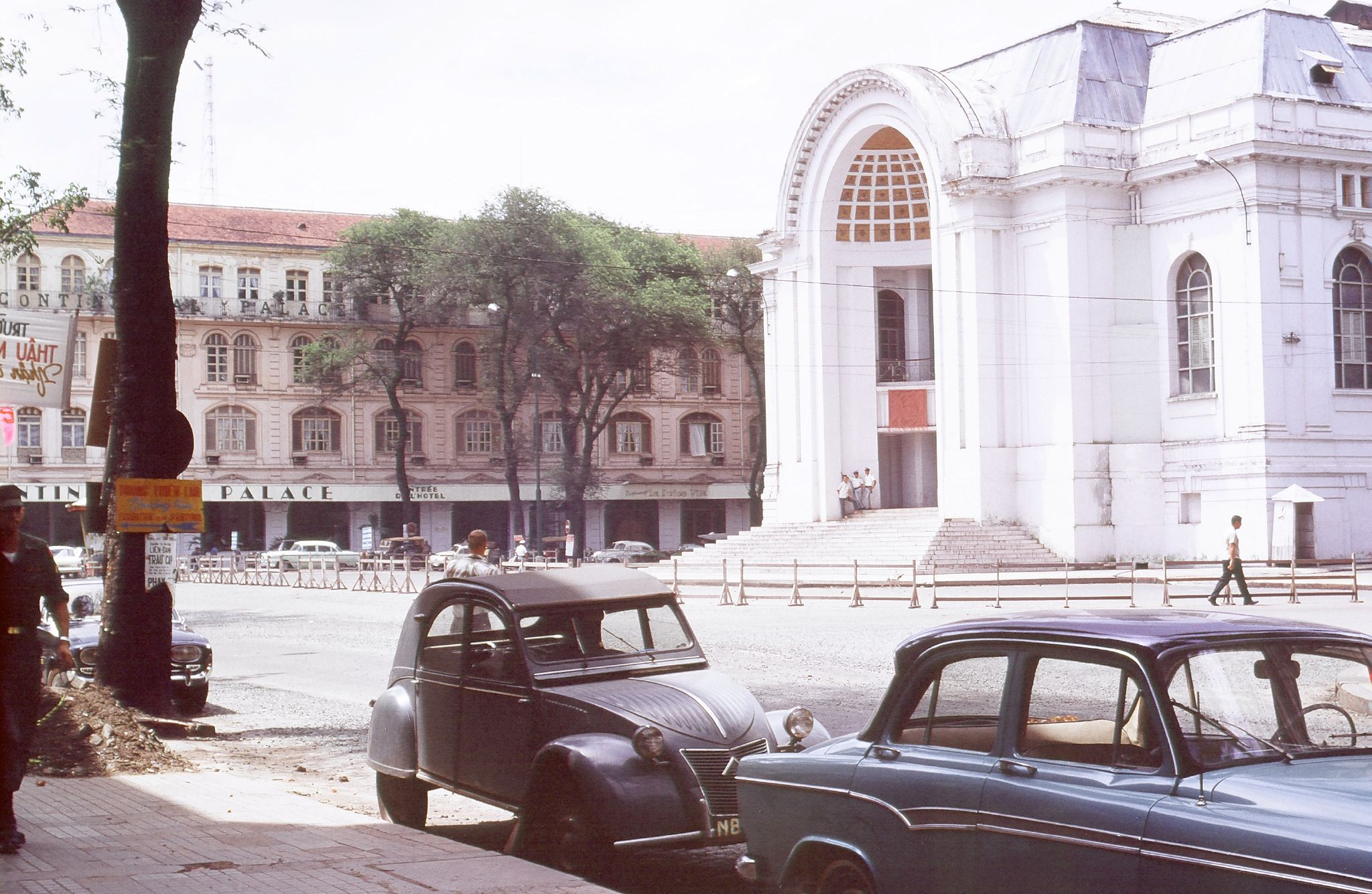
The Opera House transferred to The National Assembly building in 1967

Guitar and G-clef objet d'art behind the Opera House

Caravelle Hotel entrance

== See also ==
- Municipal Theatre of Ho Chi Minh City
- Hotel Continental Saigon
- Caravelle Hotel
- Lê Lợi Boulevard
