= Lê Lợi Boulevard =

Boulevard in Ho Chi Minh City, Vietnam

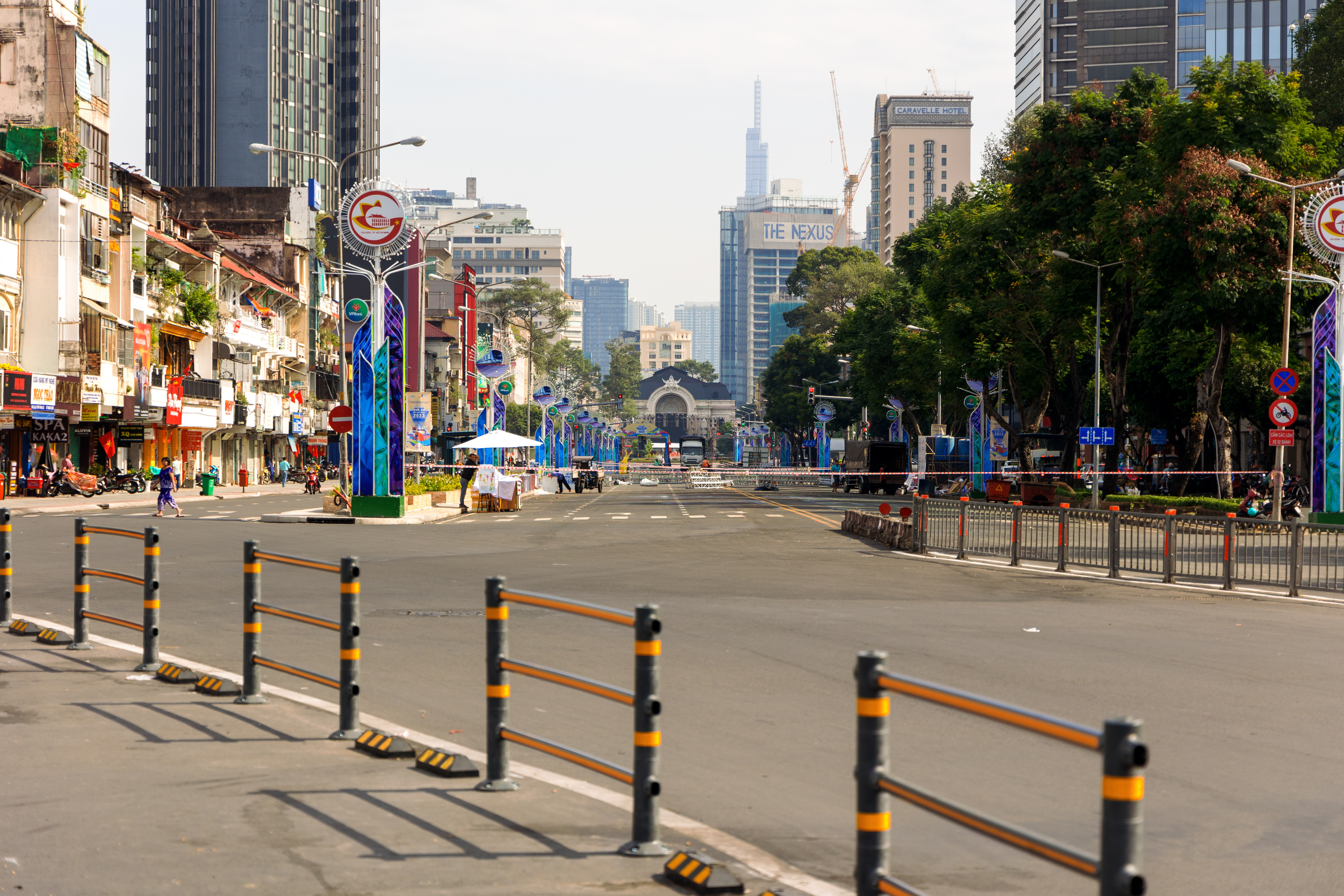
- Le Loi Boulevard in 2023 from Quách Thị Trang Square
- Interactive map of Lê Lợi Boulevard
- Native name: Đường Lê Lợi, Đại lộ Lê Lợi (Vietnamese)
- Former name: Boulevard Bonard
- Namesake: Lê Lợi
- Owner: Ho Chi Minh City
- Location: District 1, Ho Chi Minh City
- Quarter: Bến Thành, Saigon
- Nearest Ho Chi Minh City Metro L1 station: Opera House station Ben Thanh station (also on the L2 L4 L12 )
- Coordinates: 10°46′29″N 106°42′05″E
- Northeast end: Lam Sơn Square, Đồng Khởi Street
- Major junctions: Nguyễn Huệ Boulevard; Pasteur Street; Nam Kỳ Khởi Nghĩa Street; Nguyễn Trung Trực Street
- Southwest end: Quách Thị Trang Square

Lê Lợi Boulevard (Vietnamese: Đường Lê Lợi, Đại lộ Lê Lợi) is a boulevard in District 1, downtown Ho Chi Minh City, Vietnam. The boulevard stretches from Đồng Khởi Street, right across from Lam Sơn Square (in front of the Municipal Theatre of Ho Chi Minh City) to the Quách Thị Trang Square (in front of the Bến Thành Market) and directly connects to Trần Hưng Đạo Boulevard to go to Chợ Lớn.

Ho Chi Minh City Metro Line 1 runs underneath the boulevard across the Ben Thanh station and Opera House station.

== History ==
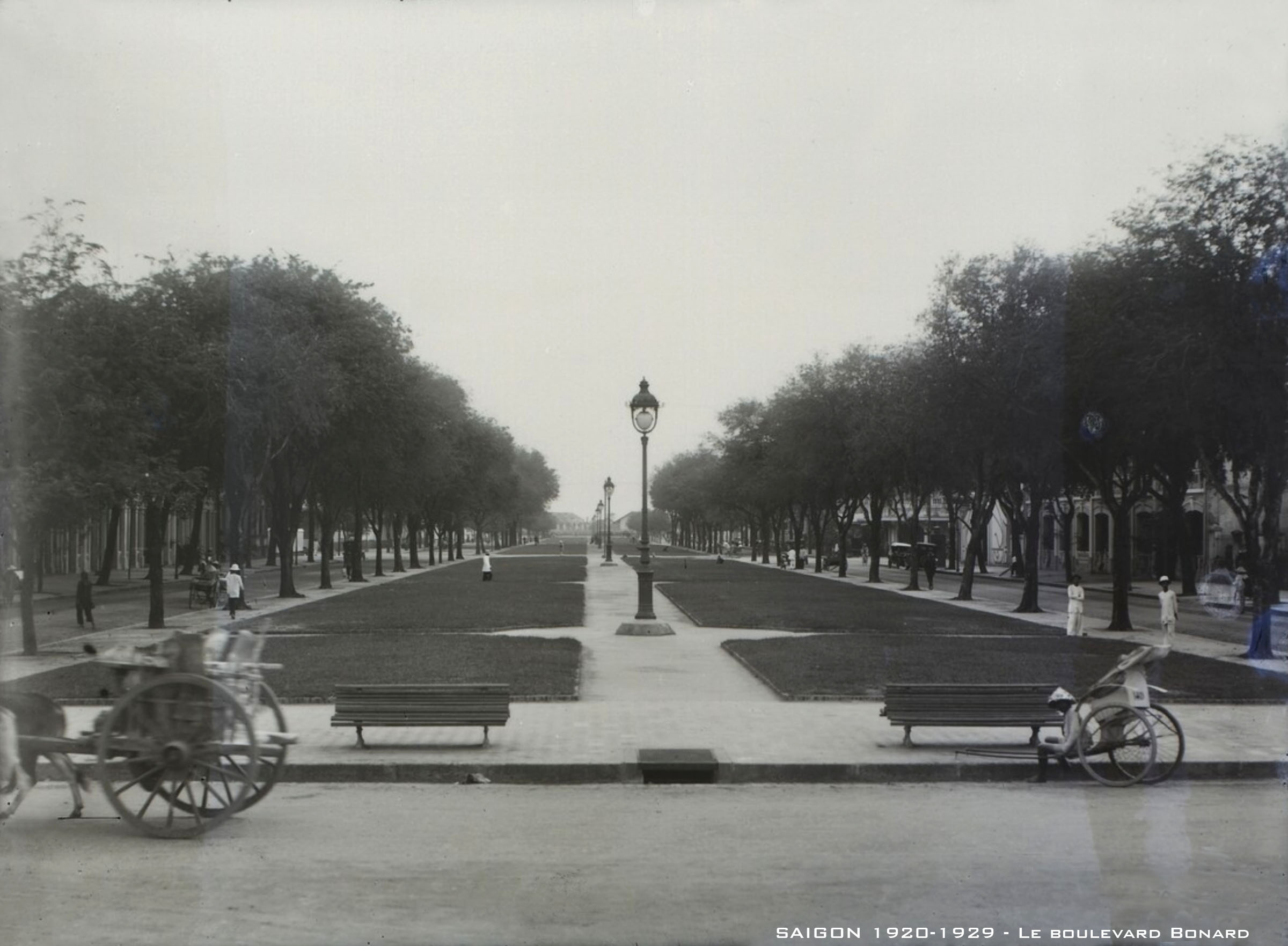
The boulevard Bonard in the 1920s

The history of the boulevard dates back to the 1860s, following the French takeover of Saigon. They ordered the digging of a 800-metre canal with two drainages, the Saigon River (near the Marine barracks) and the arroyo Chinois. One of its main goals was to drain the lower part of Saigon, which was then a pestilential swamp. This waterway was crossed perpendicularly by the "Grand Canal", which later became the Charner Boulevard.

The canal was eventually filled in to create an artery known as "rue n° 13", later changed to boulevard Bonard. The exact time when the canal was filled in is unknown, but it was estimated to be between 1870 and 1880. Initially, the Bonard Boulevard ended at Mac Mahon Street (present-day Nam Kỳ Khởi Nghĩa Street), and it was not until 1914 that the boulevard was extended to the Central Market.

In 1955, the boulevard was renamed Lê Lợi Boulevard by the government of South Vietnamafter the King Lê Lợi of the Later Lê Dynasty and the Place Augustin Foray where the northeast end of boulevard also renamed as Lam Sơn Square (the park in the middle of the square was named Lê Lợi Park in the Republic of Vietnam time then Lam Sơn Park in current) to tribute his leadership in the Lam Sơn uprising.

=== HCMC Metro Line 1 construction ===
Lê Lợi Boulevard being closed for tunnel of Metro Line 1 construction in 2015

Lê Lợi Boulevard was completely blocked off and barricaded for 8 years (from 2014 to 2022) to facilitate the construction of the underground station and tunnel of Line 1 (Bến Thành - Suối Tiên section). The barricading process began in July 2014 in the area of the Opera House. From July 22, 2014 Lê Lợi Boulevard was closed for 2 years to build the underground metro station. By 2016, the entire nearly 1km stretch extending to Bến Thành Market officially became a large, enclosed construction site. The overall view of Lê Lợi Boulevard then shows a bustling area with heavy traffic.

From 2020, the above-ground area began to be dismantled and gradually restored after the underground structures were completed. The ground on Lê Lợi Boulevard was restored after 4 years of being fenced off, section from Đồng Khởi to Pasteur were partially opened to traffic in 2020 and early 2022. Lê Lợi Boulevard has had its barriers completely removed, allowing vehicles to pass. By August 31, 2022, all barriers on the final section towards Bến Thành Market were completely removed, officially restoring the spacious appearance with 10 lanes, wide sidewalks, and restoring the bustling life and business in the city center. Completely removing barriers, Lê Lợi Boulevard's ground officially returned after 8 years of being fenced off.

== Notable buildings ==
Address	Name	Image	Cross-street	Notes and notable tenants
6A Lê Lợi Blvd	Saigon Union Square	Saigon Vincom Center A, now is Saigon Union Square	171 Đồng Khởi – 53 Lê Thánh Tôn – 116 Nguyễn Huệ	Mandarin Oriental, Saigon will be opened here. Originally called as Vincom Center A. It was the place of Passage Eden. Older address is 2-4 Lê Lợi
4–6 Lê Lợi Blvd	Rex Hotel	Rex Hotel in 2023 Lunar New Year	141 Nguyễn Huệ Blvd – Lê Thánh Tôn Street	
8 Lê Lợi Blvd	Eximbank Lê Lợi Transaction Office			
26 Lê Lợi Blvd	26 Lê Lợi Apartment	26 Lê Lợi Building in 2011	128A–130 Pasteur Street	Bạch Đằng Ice Cream and An Phước – Pierre Cardin
28–28A Lê Lợi Blvd				Next to Liberty Central Saigon Citypoint Hotel, Gloria Jean's Coffees was rent here but moved out currently
40–54 Lê Lợi Blvd	Row of shophouses			
60–62 Lê Lợi Blvd	FAHASA Saigon Bookstore			
66 Lê Lợi Blvd	El Gaucho Steakhouse		Nam Kỳ Khởi Nghĩa Street	
Lê Lợi Blvd	Saigon Jewelry Centre (SJC) Tower	Duong_nam_Ky_khoi_Nghia_va_Le_Loi,_phuong_Ben_thanh,_Quận_1,_TPHCM,_Việt_Nam_-_panoramio	101 Nam Kỳ Khởi Nghĩa – Nguyễn Trung Trực – Lê Thánh Tôn	Empty lot. Previously was the place of International Trade Center before October 2002
68–70 Lê Lợi Blvd	68 Lê Lợi Apartment	Lê Lợi - Nguyễn Trung Trực, Bến Thành	Nguyễn Trung Trực Street	Shamoji Robata Yaki, Yen Sushi & Sake Pub are renting here, previously was rented by Bến Thành Jewelry and Bến Thành Tourist
88 Lê Lợi Blvd	88 Lê Lợi Apartment	Duong_Le_loi,_phuong_Ben_thanh,_quan_1,_tp_HcmVn_-_panoramio		
108–110 Lê Lợi Blvd	108 Lê Lợi Apartment			
120–122 Lê Lợi Blvd	Row of shophouses		Phan Bội Châu Street	
11–15 Lê Lợi Blvd	Opera View Building – Artex Saigon	Opera_View	161 Đồng Khởi Street	Louis Vuitton, Franck Muller, Time Swiss, Vietcombank Money Exchange Bureau
23 Lê Lợi Blvd	Saigontourist Headquarters Building		98–100–102 Nguyễn Huệ Blvd	Saigontourist, Skyzone Nguyễn Huệ Rooftop Beer garden
33–35 Lê Lợi Blvd	Saigon Tax Trade Centre	Thuong_Xa_Tax,_quan_1,_tpHcm_-_panoramio	135 Nguyễn Huệ Blvd	Demolished and waiting for rebuilt
65–67 Lê Lợi Blvd	Saigon Centre	Saigon_Centre_on_June_17,_2017	92–94 Nam Kỳ Khởi Nghĩa – 57 Pasteur – Huỳnh Thúc Kháng	Takashimaya Ho Chi minh City located at 67 Lê Lợi
119–121 Lê Lợi Blvd	Saigon Square Mall by Hoàng Thành		77–89 Nam Kỳ Khởi Nghĩa Street	F.Studio of FPT and A Square Coffee are renting the Lê Lợi side of the mall
123 Lê Lợi Blvd	Capital Building			Previously was Kim Đô Office Building
125 Lê Lợi Blvd	Saigon General Hospital	Benh_vien_Sai_Gon,_quan_1,duong_le_loi,_tphcmvn_-_panoramio	Quách Thị Trang Square	

== Gallery ==
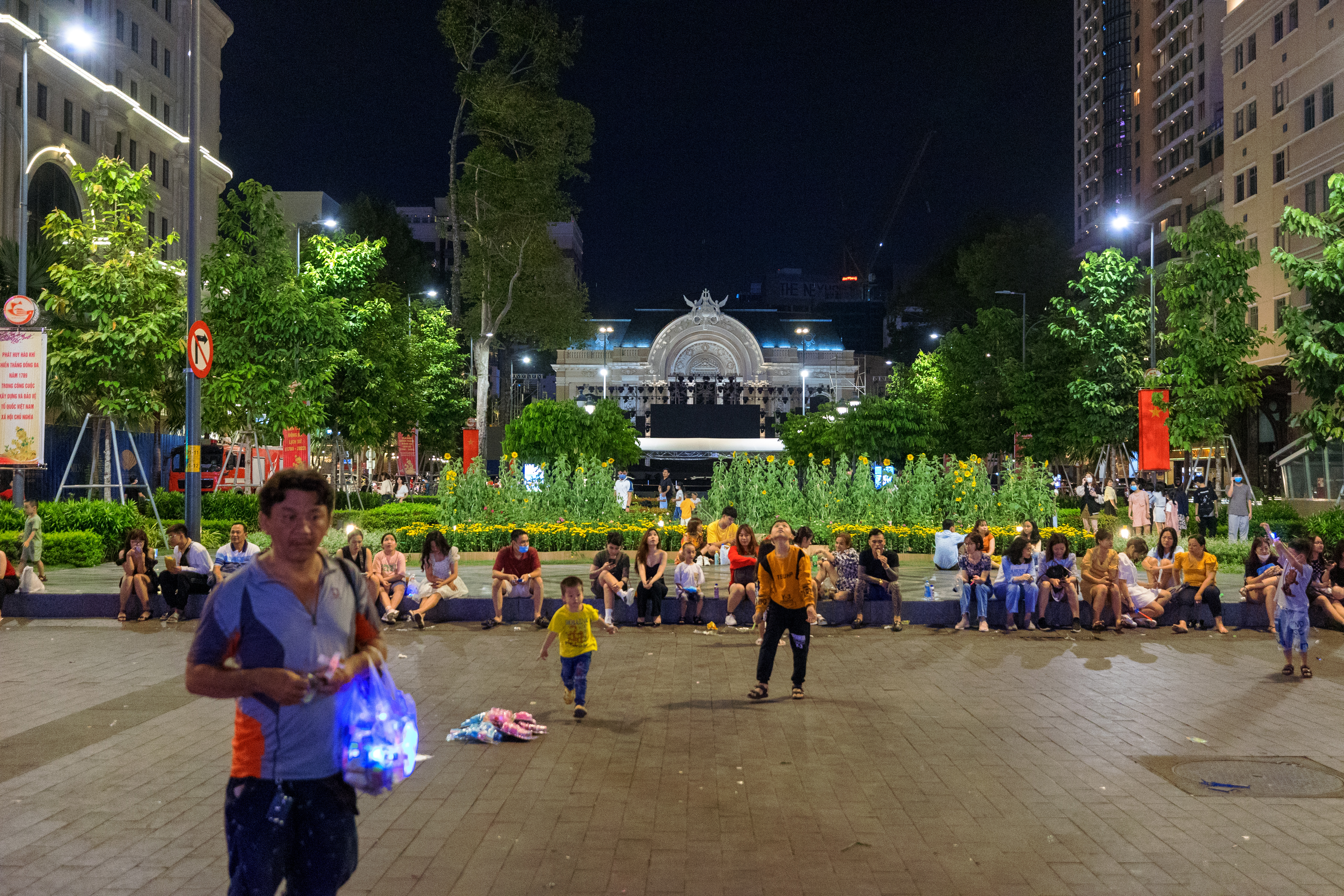
Lam Sơn Park with Opera House in 2023

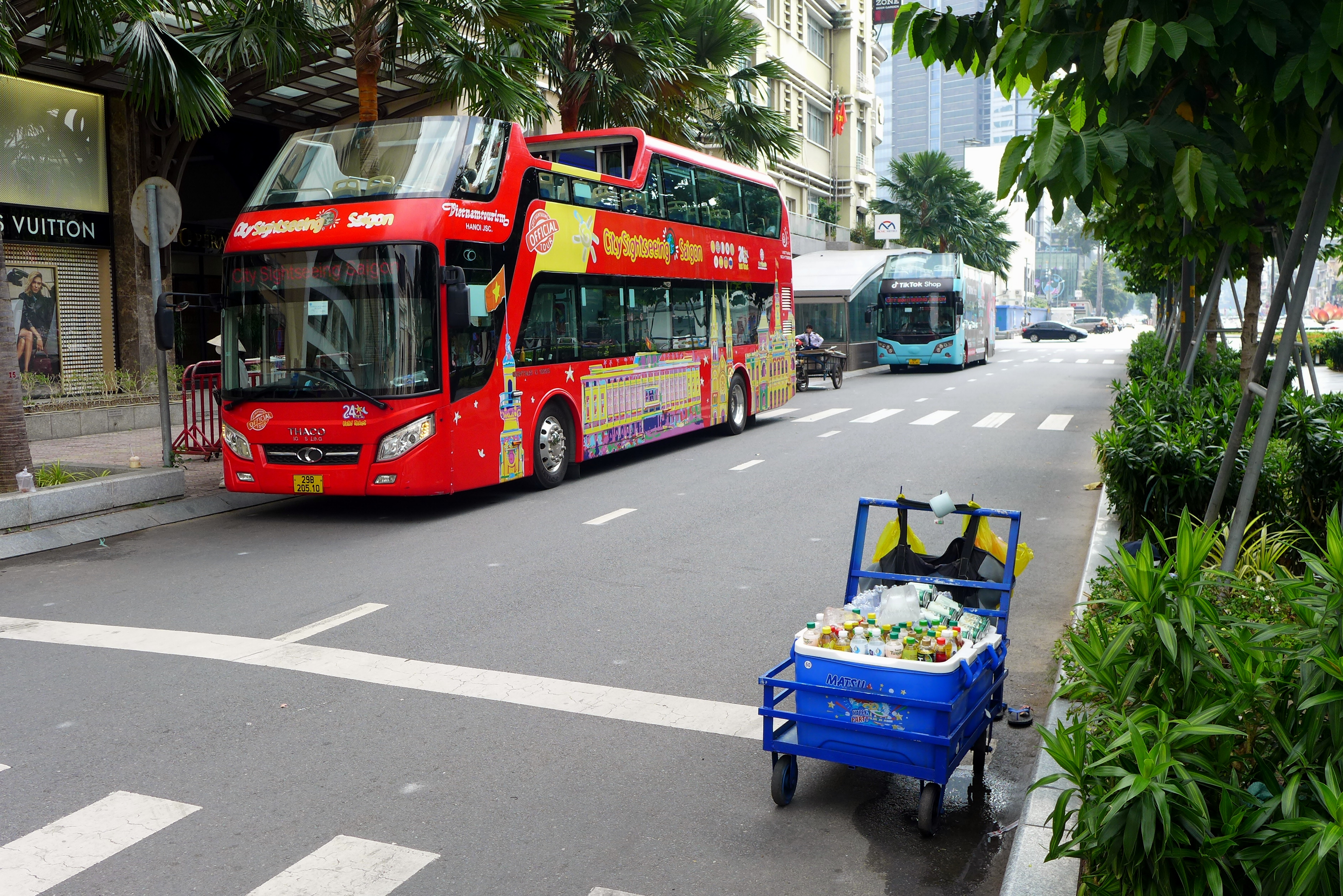
A City Sightseeing Thaco Bus next to The Opera View building

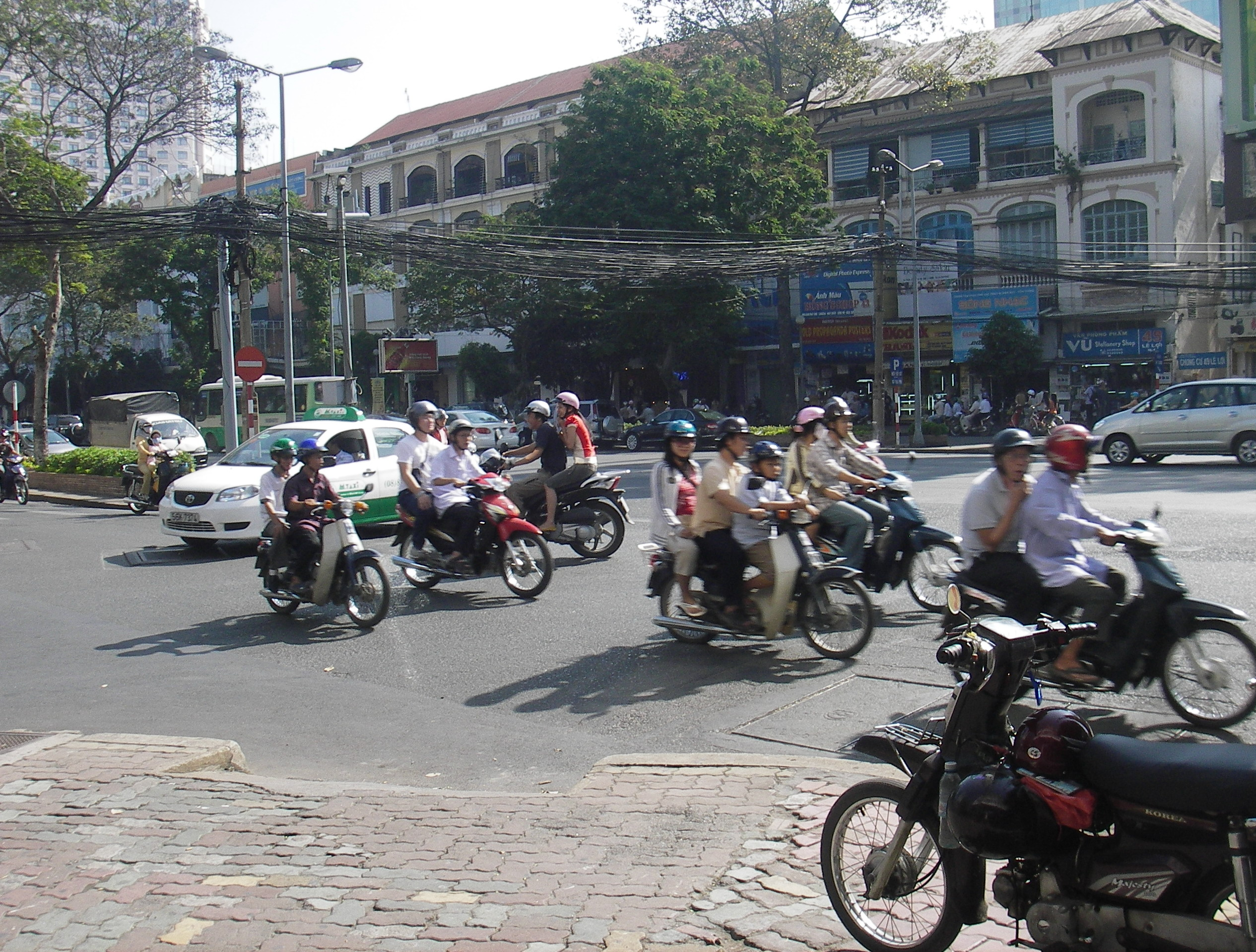
49 Lê Lợi Apartment in 2007, later demolished along with the Saigon Tax Trade Center

Former 49 Lê Lợi Apartment at corner of Lê Lợi - Pasteur

== See also ==
- Nguyễn Huệ Boulevard
- Hàm Nghi Boulevard
