= Saigon Tax Trade Centre =

- Thương xá TAX
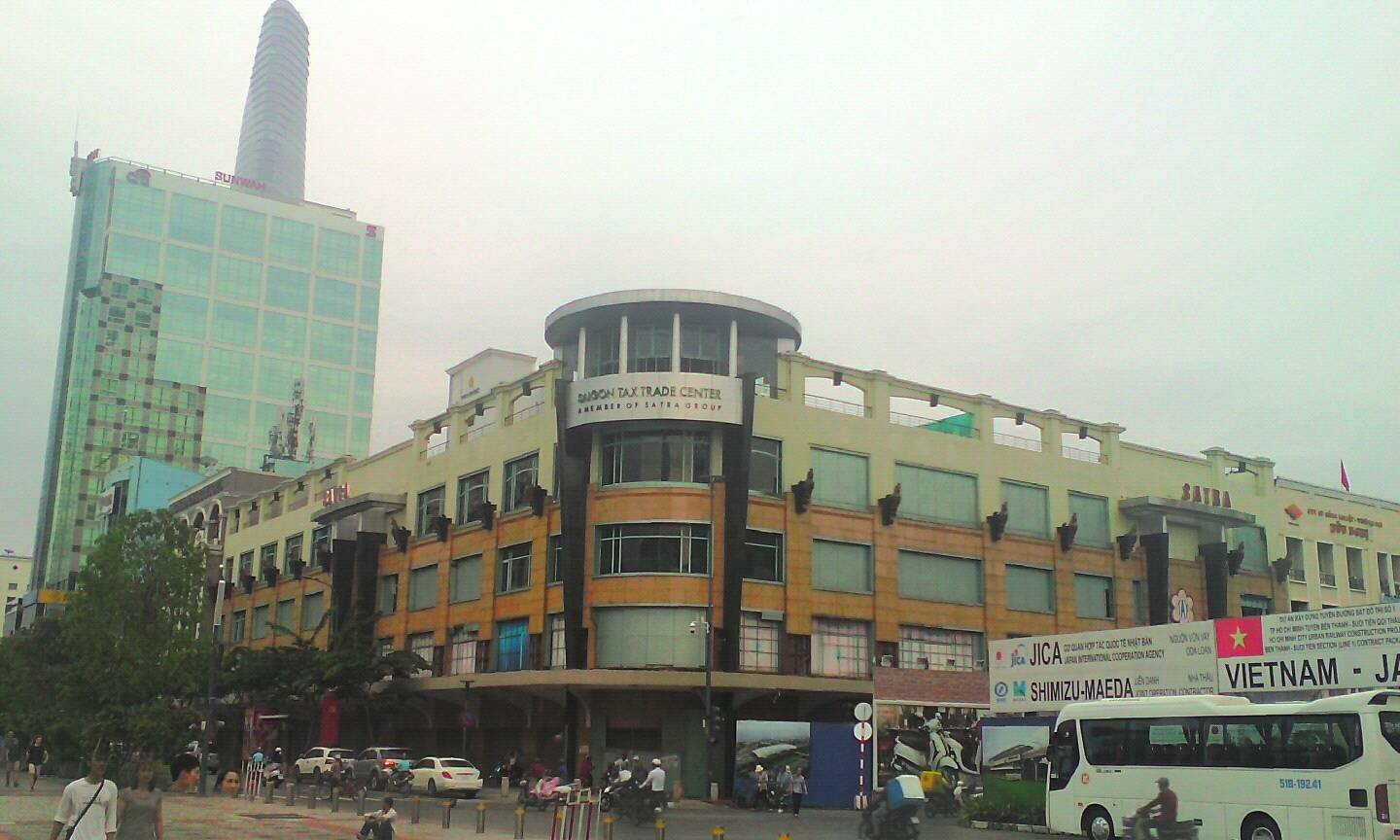
- Saigon TAX Trade Centre on its demolition day in 2016
- Location: Nguyễn Huệ – Lê Lợi Roundabout
- Address: 135 Nguyễn Huệ Boulevard and 39 Lê Lợi Boulevard, Bến Nghé, District 1, Ho Chi Minh City
- Opened: 1880
- Closed: 25 September 2014
- Previous names: Grands Magasins Charner de Saigon (1914-1960); Municipal Children Service Store (1978-1981); Municipal General Department Store (1981-1997); Saigon General Retail Company (1997-1998)
- Owner: Saigon Trading Group (SATRA)
- Floor area: 15.000 square metres (161.46 ft^{2})
- Floors: 4
- Public transit: 1 Opera House station

Saigon Tax Trade Centre (Vietnamese: Trung Tâm Thương mại Thương xá Tax or simply Thương xá TAX) was a department store in District 1, Ho Chi Minh City, Vietnam. It was located at 135 Nguyen Hue Boulevard and 39 Le Loi Boulevard, in Bến Nghé ward (now Saigon ward), at the corner of a roundabout of the intersection of both boulevards.

It was closed in late September 2014, and demolished in October 2016 to redevelope into a 40-floor complex skyscraper building named Satra TAX Plaza, with the department store podium of the tower is proposed to keep almost the same design with the former building.

== History ==
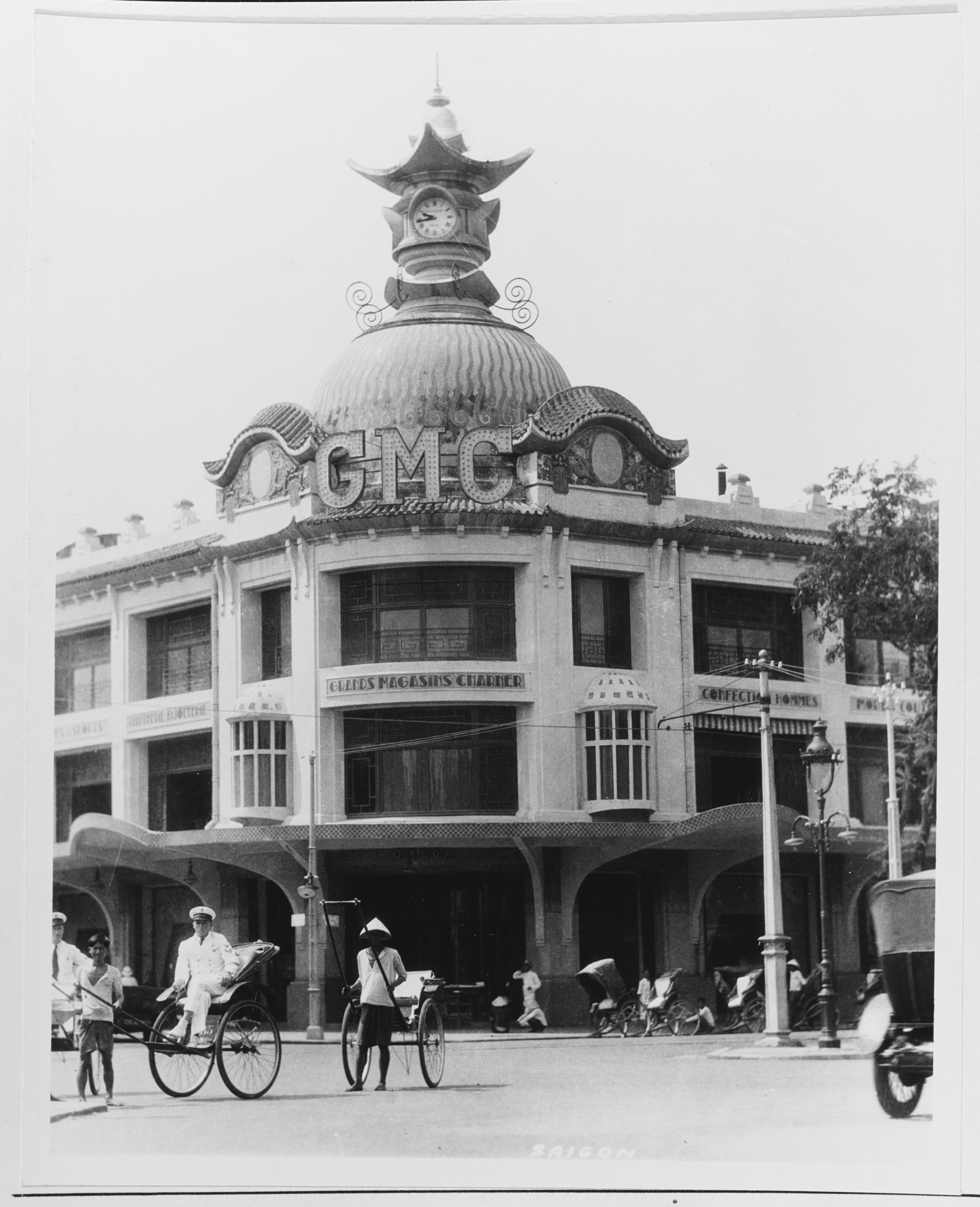
Grands Magasins Charner Department Store, Saigon, 1932

=== French Indochina era ===
The original architectural structure was built in 1880 during the French colonial Vietnam in downtown Saigon at the corner of both boulevards of Charner and Bonard, nearby the City Hall (hôtel de ville). In 1914, the Société Coloniale des Grands Magasins opened the Grands Magasins Charner de Saigon (abbr. SGMC). By 1924, the building complex had been rebuilt and expanded in the style of Art Deco welcoming high-end customers of the largest city of the French Indochinathen. November 27, 1924, the department store was opened and became memorable and bustling event in Saigon that received widespread media coverage.

In October 1925, the building installed an electric siren system to sound whenever new news arrived from the national newspaper. In 1942, a fourth floor was added, the clock tower was demolished, and a GMC plaque was replaced.

=== South Vietnam era ===
During the South Vietnam era, both the boulevards of Charner and Bonard were renamed as Nguyễn Huệ Boulevard and Lê Lợi Boulevard, respectively, and are kept until now. The Grands Magasins Charner renamed as Thương xá TAX (TAX Department Store or Saigon TAX Trade Center) in 1960 with the new address 135 Nguyễn Huệ Boulevard. In the 1960s, Archbishop Pierre Martin Ngô Đình Thục authorized for Dalat University to purchase this building, which then became property of the Archdiocese of Saigon. Following the 1963 South Vietnamese coup d'état, the new government confiscated the shopping center, claiming it was linked to the Ngô family. Since then, the shopping center has no longer belonged to a single company but has been leased by individual merchants for business purposes.

=== Post-1975 era ===
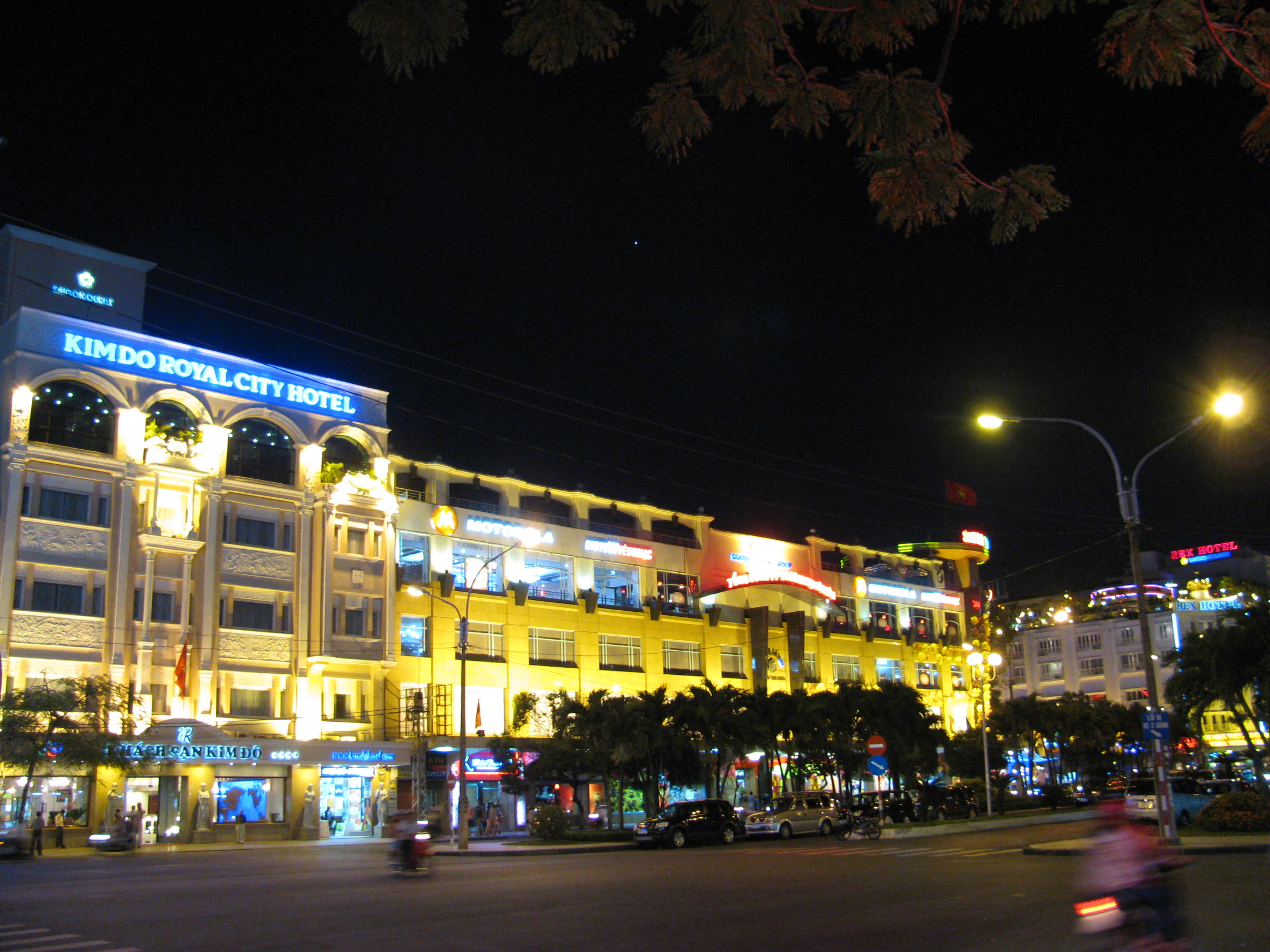
Saigon TAX Trade Center with Kim Đô Royal City Hotel (left) at night in 2009

By 1978, during the subsidy period, TAX Department Store became a state-owned "Municipal Children Service Store (Cửa hàng Phục vụ Thiếu nhi Thành phố)" company, the vendors were called trade clerks (mậu dịch viên), wore red scarves like children and sold mainly toys for children. In 1981, the building was renamed as "Municipal General Department Store (Cửa hàng Bách hóa Tổng hợp Thành phố)" owned by the Ho Chi Minh City Department of Commerce (Sở Thương Nghiệp Thành phố Hồ Chí Minh) In 1997, the building was renamed as "Saigon General Retail Company (Công ty Bán lẻ Tổng hợp Sài Gòn)" managed by Saigon Trading Corporation (SATRA; Tổng Công ty Thương mại Sài Gòn). In 1998, the former name Thương xá TAX was recovered (its official name is Saigon TAX Trade Center). In 2003, the building has undergone a final major renovation.

=== Demolition and redevelopment ===
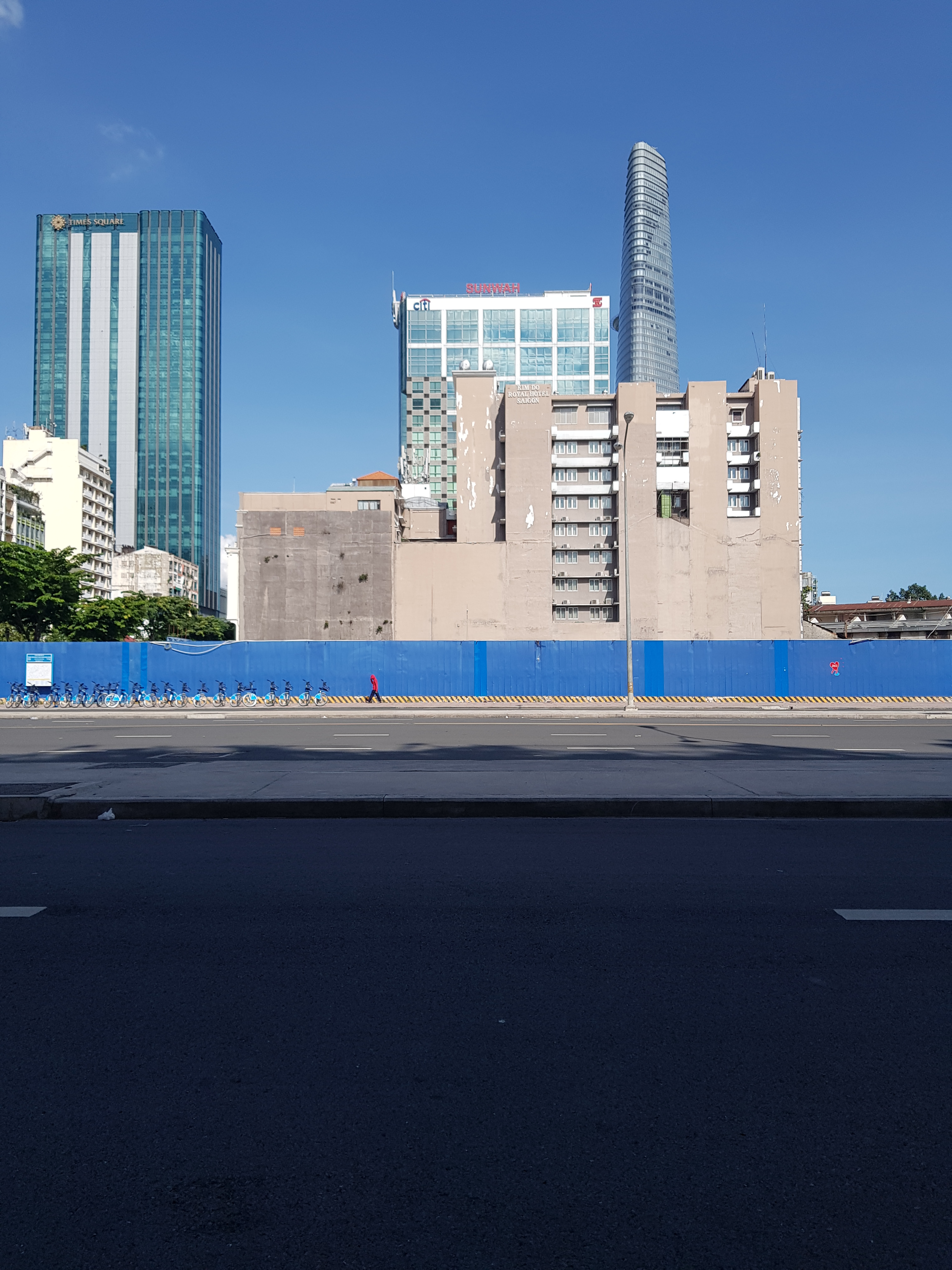
The Saigon TAX Trade Centre site in 2022

On September 25, 2014, the Saigo TAX Trade Center Store was officially ordered to close for demolition to make way for a 40-story skyscraper on the site, initially named as SATRA TAX Plaza (included the plot of former Viễn Đông Building, also known as 57 Lê Lợi Apartment). Several options for preserving the interior were implemented two years before the official demolition. On October 12, 2016, the demolition of the department sbegan.

Today, the former commercial land plot after the demolition in 2016 is vacant with the ventilation of the Ho Chi Minh City Metro Line 1 there on the side of Lê Lợi Boulevard with the Entrance 3 of the Opera House station nearby. It was used for events for a period of time, until 2026, the land would be redeveloped into a temporary park (along with several other vacant plots in the city such as the former site of Phan Đình Phùng Gymnasium, International Trading Center, Lavenue Crown 8–12 Lê Duẩn or 2–4–6 Hai Bà Trưng) at the request of the city government. This temporary park is being built by Khang Điền real estate group.

== Branches ==
The Saigon Tax Trade Center building was demolished, yet its name is still a legal entity and a member of Saigon Trading Corporation (SATRA). It is now operating with a model of 7 retail stores selling handicrafts, Vietnamese specialties, souvenirs and F&B, all are still well-known by domestic and foreign customers. All the stores are also locating of the area of District 1 and not too far from the original buildings, those are on the streets of Nguyễn Huệ, Lê Lợi, Đồng Khởi and Phan Chu Trinh. Addresses of all the stores:

- 9–11 Phan Chu Trinh Street, Bến Thành
- 15–17 Phan Chu Trinh Street, Bến Thành
- 74–74B Lê Lợi Blvd, Bến Thành
- 107 Nguyễn Huệ Blvd, Bến Nghé
- 103 Nguyễn Huệ Blvd, Bến Nghé
- 45 Nguyễn Huệ Blvd, Bến Nghé
- 32 Đồng Khởi Street, Bến Nghé

== Gallery ==
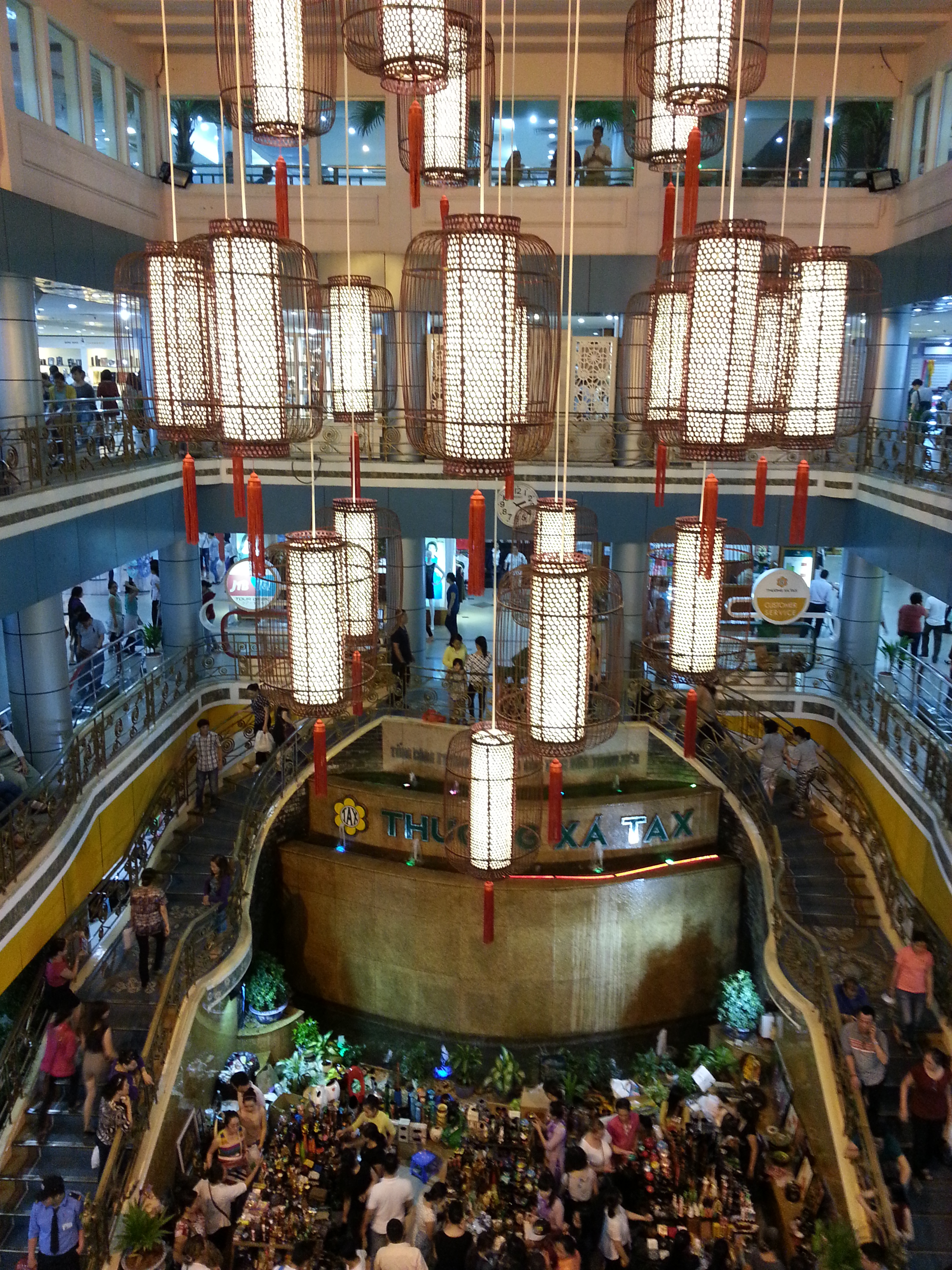
Overall interior of Saigon Tax Trade Centre

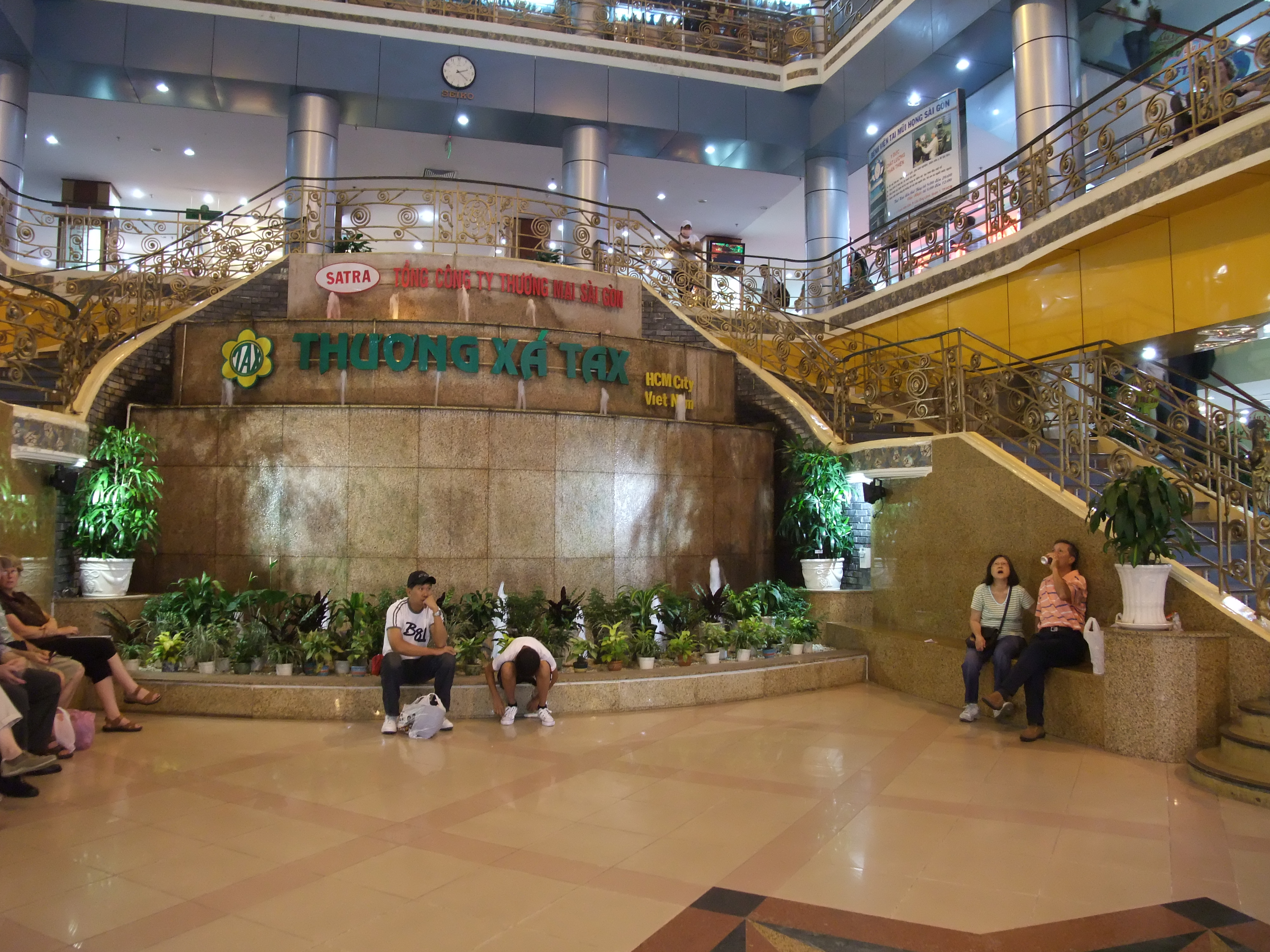
Main hall with the iconic mosaic staircase

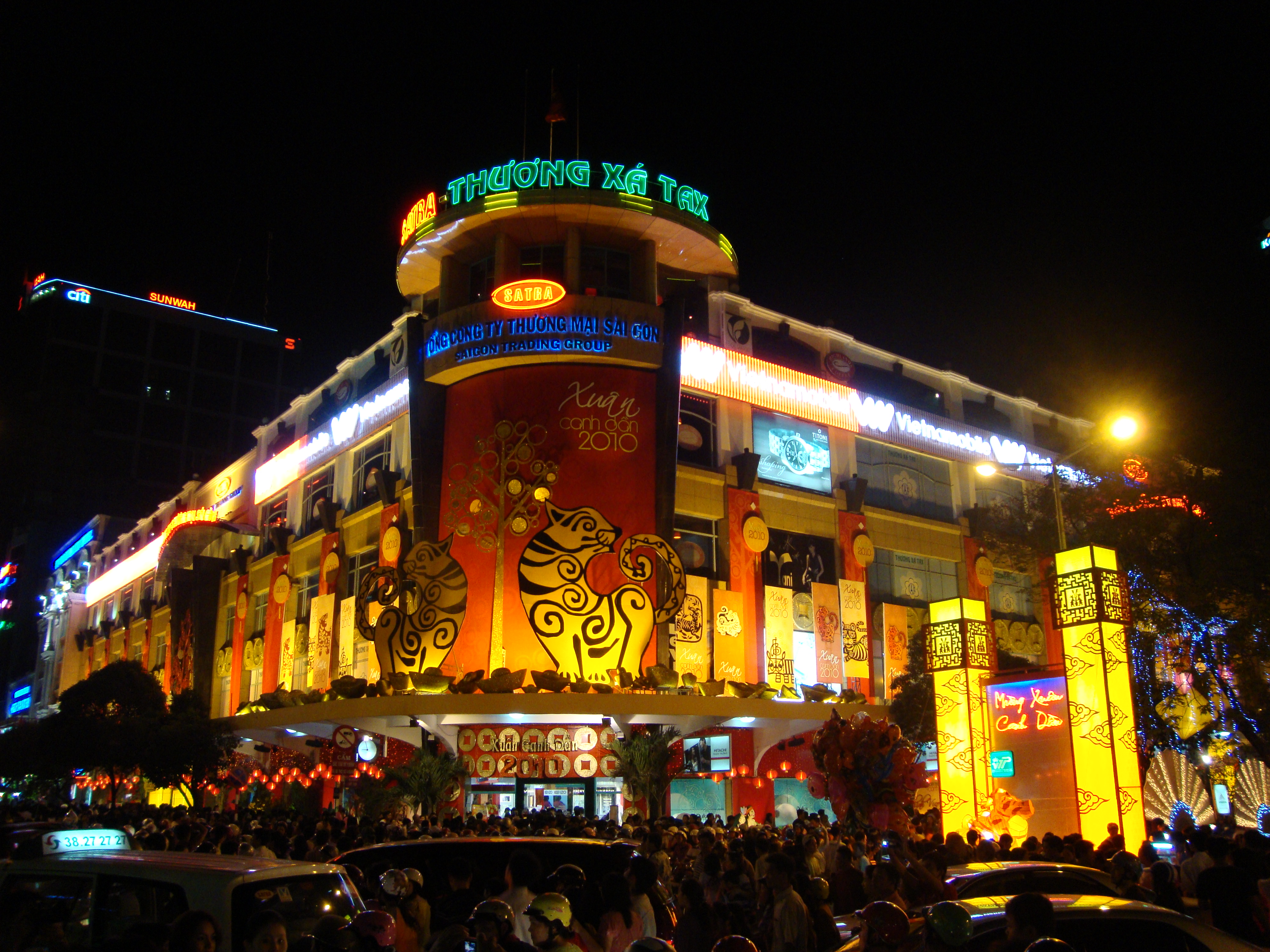
Saigon TAX Trade Centre in celebration for 2010 Tết of Yang Metal Tiger

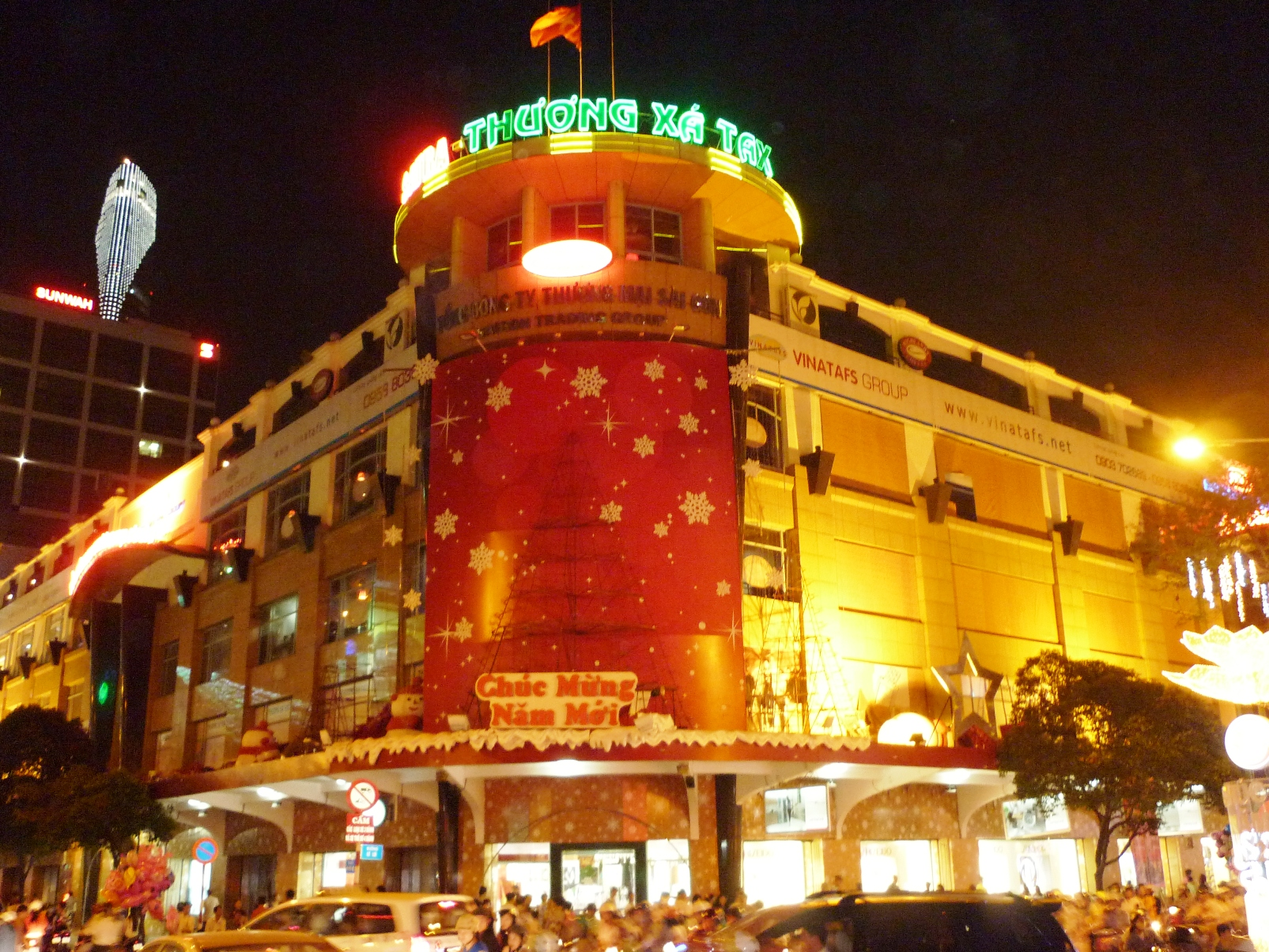
Saigon Tax Trade Centre in New Year's Day 2011

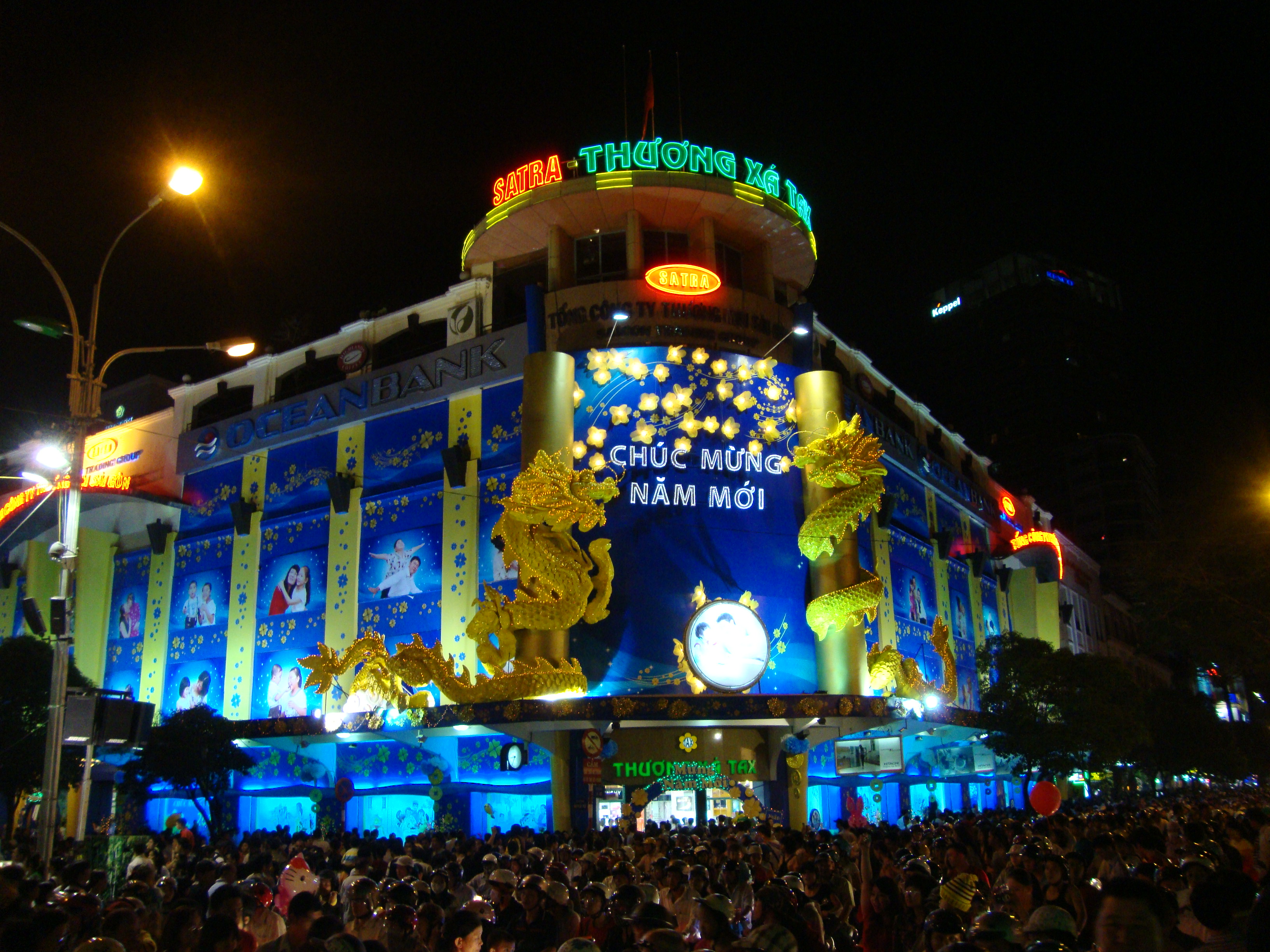
Saigon TAX Trade Center in Tết 2012

Saigon TAX Trade Center in Festive season 2012

Saigon Tax Trade Centre in Tết 2013

Saigon Tax Trade Centre in 2013 Festive season

Saigon Tax Trade Centre in Tết 2014

Saigon Tax Trade Center with Saigon Centre in the back is under construction for the Tower 2

== See also ==
- Saigon Trade Center
- Saigon Centre
- Rex Hotel
