= Australian Embassy Guard Platoon, Saigon =

- Active: 1972–1973
- Branch: Australian Army
- Role: Embassy security
- Size: Initially up to 27 soldiers, later reduced
- Location: Australian Embassy, Saigon
- Engagements: Vietnam War

The Australian Embassy Guard Platoon, Saigon was an Australian Army unit assigned to protect the Australian embassy in South Vietnam. The platoon was established in March 1972 as the Guard and Escort Platoon, and was redesignated in December that year. The Australian Embassy Guard Platoon, Saigon was disbanded at the end of June 1973. It was the final Australian Army unit to serve in South Vietnam.

== History ==
For much of the Australian involvement in the Vietnam War, the Australian embassy in Saigon was protected by Australian Army personnel drawn from either the 1st Australian Task Force in Phuoc Tuy province or members of Australian Forces Vietnam who were stationed in Saigon. This force was squad-sized, and comprised only a small number of soldiers.

As part of the draw-down of Australian troops in the country, Australian Forces Vietnam was disbanded on 5 March 1972, and replaced with the small Australian Army Assistance Group Vietnam (AAAGV). At this time the squad assigned to protect the embassy was expanded to a platoon, which was designated the Guard and Escort Platoon. The Australian Army Training Team Vietnam (AATTV), which provided training and advisers for the Army of the Republic of Vietnam, was the main Australian force remaining in the country. On 17 December 1972, AAAGV was disbanded. The next day most members of it and the AATTV departed from South Vietnam.

On 18 December 1972 the Australian Embassy Guard Platoon, Saigon was formally established by redesignating the Guard and Escort Platoon. It comprised 24 former members of the AAAGV. These soldiers and the military attaché who had been posted to the embassy were the last-remaining members of the Australian Army in South Vietnam. At this time the embassy was located at the Caravelle Hotel, where it occupied a full floor.

The Guard Platoon was phased out over the first half of 1973. At the start of the year it comprised one or two officers and 25 other ranks. Reductions to the size of the unit occurred in March and April. The Platoon was disbanded at the end of June 1973; at this time it had a strength of six soldiers. Overall, more than 50 soldiers served with the Platoon during its existence. The Australian Embassy Guard Platoon, Saigon was the last Australian Army unit to have served in South Vietnam. The Department of Veterans' Affairs has classified members of the platoon as having undertaken warlike service, making them eligible for service and disability pensions.

== See also ==
- Security Detachment Iraq (Australia)
