= Caravelle Hotel =

Hotel in Ho Chi Minh City, Vietnam

Caravelle Hotel Saigon
- Khách sạn Caravelle Sài Gòn
- Caravelle Hotel at night with the Heritage Wing on the right and the higher Opera Wing
- Former names: Grand Cafe de la Terrasse (Late 19th century); Independence Hotel (Khách sạn Độc Lập, 1975-1992)
- Hotel chain: WorldHotels Elite

General information
- Status: Completed
- Architectural style: Modernist (1959); Post-modern (1998)
- Location: Opera Wing: 19–21–23 Lam Sơn Square; Heritage Wing: 130 Đồng Khởi Street, Saigon, Ho Chi Minh City, Vietnam
- Coordinates: 10.776062°N 106.703631°E
- Current tenants: Air France; Vertu
- Named for: Sud Aviation Caravelle
- Groundbreaking: 1957
- Inaugurated: December 24, 1959; 66 years ago
- Renovated: October 1992
- Owner: Saigontourist
- Landlord: Chains-Caravelle (joint venture between Saigontourist and Chains International Hotels Management Singapore Pte. Ltd)

Technical details
- Floor count: 10 (Heritage Wing); 24 (Opera Wing)

Design and construction
- Architect: Nguyễn Văn Hòa

Other information
- Number of rooms: 335
- Public transit: L1 Opera House station

Website
- Caravelle Hotel Saigon

The Caravelle Hotel Saigon, or also written as Hotel Caravelle Saigon and Caravelle Saigon Hotel (or shortly by exclude "Saigon"), is located in District 1, Ho Chi Minh City, Vietnam. The hotel was opened to the public on Christmas Eve 1959, when the city was still officially known as Saigon. It was named after the Sud Aviation Caravelle, a jet airliner operated by the hotel's owner Air France at that time. Currently, Caravelle Hotel is owned by the state-owned Saigon Tourist Co and a member of WorldHotels Elite.

== History ==
Caravelle Hotel in December 1967

The original location of the Caravelle Hotel during the French Indochina was the Grand Cafe de la Terrasse, one of Saigon’s first and most famous cafés, dating back to the late 19th century. The current structure was begun in 1957 and inaugurated on Christmas Eve in 1959. At that time, the Caravelle Hotel was the most modern and tallest building in Saigon. During the 1960s, the Caravelle was home to the embassies of Australia, New Zealand with the Saigon bureaus of NBC, ABC and CBS. As a hub of communication, it played an important role in the Vietnam War. The Manifesto of the Eighteen became better known as the Caravelle Manifesto after a press conference to announce it was held at the hotel.

On the morning of August 25, 1964, at around 11:30 am, a bomb exploded in room 514, on a floor occupied mostly by foreign journalists, who were all out on assignment. Nine rooms were damaged, windows were blown out of several cars parked in the street, and a number of people were injured without fatalities.

Saigon Saigon Rooftop Bar in 2014

The Australian Embassy was protected by Australian Army soldiers. As part of the draw-down of Australian forces in the country, these became the independent Australian Embassy Guard Platoon, Saigon which was stationed at the Caravelle Hotel from March 1972 until June 1973.

Following the fall of Saigon in 1975, the hotel was taken over and operated by the government and renamed the Khách sạn Độc Lập (Independence Hotel). This name remained until 1998, when the Caravelle name was relaunched following refurbishment.

== Architecture ==
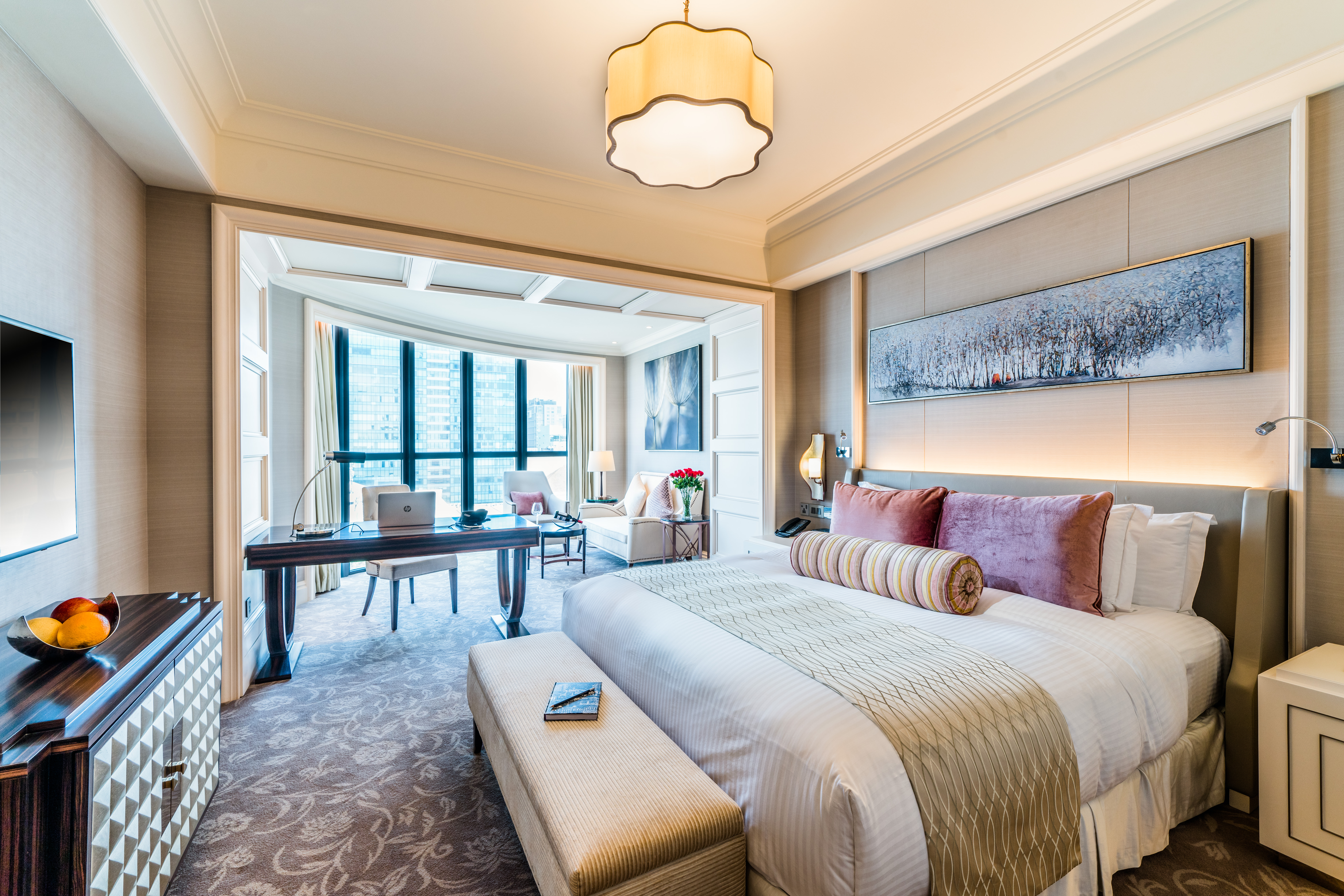
Signature Studio Room, Heritage Wing

The hotel’s modernist design was the work of a Vietnamese architect, Mr. Nguyễn Văn Hòa, an alumnus of the École Supérieure des Beaux-Arts in Hanoi. Contemporary journalists noted its use of Italian marble, bullet-proof glass, a "state-of-the-art air-conditioning system and a Berliet private generator." The original ten-story building is now adjoined to the post-modern 24-story tower that forms the bulk of the new property and separated as Heritage Wing and Opera Wing, respectively. However, the Saigon Saigon Rooftop Bar has been upgraded several times since 1959.

=== Usage ===
In the Heritage Wing, the ground floor houses the hotel lobby and the local commercial offices of Air France. Space is also rented by Vertu for its Vietnam Flagship Showroom; other tenants include Mon Amie Tailor House and the Café de l'Opera. Below this is a basement level. Floors two through six are occupied by the hotel, with up to 13 units per floor, totaling 43 units. The seventh floor was home to the Australian Embassy, according to the hotel official website. The eighth and ninth floors contain restaurants. At the very top (the 10th floor) is the Saigon Saigon Rooftop Bar.

== In popular culture ==
Caravelle Saigon Hotel entrance at the Opera Wing

Hotel Caravelle Saigon has become part of Vietnam-related fiction and non-fiction literature, such as in Danielle Steele's novel Message from Nam and Morley Safer's memoir Flashbacks. Also in movie, it was when director Phillip Noyce in 2002 surveyed Lam Sơn Square as a movie set for the dramatic bombing scene in the movie adaptation Graham Greene’s The Quiet American, he chose the Caravelle as a stand-in for the historic Hotel Continental Saigon across the square. It was not that the Caravelle looked anything like the Continental, but the renovations at the Continental and the cost of shooting scenes at the hotel ruled out the original as an option. As the ground floor of the Caravelle "donned stage makeup and a new persona for its acting debut", actors in the movie moved into the Presidential Suites upstairs. Hotel staff remember the British actor Michael Caine, who was nominated for Best Actor at the 75th Academy Awards for his portrayal of Thomas Fowler from the movie, as an extremely amiable character. Caine would take tea in the bar, chit chat with the restaurant staff, and after discovering that the hotel buffet included roast beef and Yorkshire puddings, became a regular fixture at the restaurant.

Beside Caine, the American and Canadian actor Brendan Fraser or other people in The Quiet American crew, the hotel has also hosted other well-known figures when they visited Vietnam, such as the 42nd President of the United States Bill Clinton, Italian-French fashion designer Pierre Cardin.
