= 2002 Ho Chi Minh City ITC fire =

Fatal fire in Vietnam

2002 International Trading Center Fire
- Local firefighters dealing with the fire
- Native name: Vụ cháy Trung tâm Thương mại Quốc tế 2002
- Date: 29 October 2002
- Time: c. 13:30 (UTC+07:00)
- Venue: International Trading Center, 101 Nam Kỳ Khởi Nghĩa st.
- Location: Bến Thành, District 1, Ho Chi Minh City, Vietnam; 10°46′26″N 106°41′59″E
- Type: Structure fire
- Cause: Weld spatter
- Deaths: 60
- Injuries: 90

On 29 October 2002, a fire occurred in the International Trading Center (ITC) (Vietnamese: Trung Tâm Thương mại Quốc tế) in Ho Chi Minh City, Vietnam. The six-story complex building was occupied by a department store, a disco and offices of several foreign companies. The fire killed 60 people and injured 90 others, making it one of the deadliest peacetime disasters in Vietnam.

== Building ==
The International Trading Center (ITC) was an office building and shopping center, located on the quadrilateral tile of Nam Kỳ Khởi Nghĩa, Lê Lợi, Nguyễn Trung Trực and Lê Thánh Tôn streets in Bến Thành, District 1, Ho Chi Minh City. The building has six floors with a total area of 6,500m², built in 1970, at that time it was called Tam Đa Trade Center (Thương xá Tam Đa) in Vietnamese or Crystal Palace in English. The building was renovated in 1985, used both as an office building with 59 rooms for rent and as a shopping center with 172 stalls of gold, silver and gemstone. Furthermore, the building also has a discotheque named Blue (where the fire first started), an ice skating rink, restaurants and canteens.

The building had been insured since 1997, the Reuters news agency reported, for a total value of 12.3 billion Vietnamese đồng (about 800,000 USD) at the time of the fire.

== Inferno ==
The fire occurred on Tuesday, 29 October 2002, beginning at 1:15 p.m. local time (0615 GMT). Thirty fire engines and 40 ambulances surrounded the building. Intense heat and flames prevented firefighters from entering the building for about four hours. It took firefighters more than five hours to extinguish the inferno. Bodies were still being recovered from theate that day.

According to officials in the Vietnam People's Army, firefighters were not adequately equipped to fight the fire and lacked water to put out the flames. Power in the area was cut off and streets were cordoned off. Flames raged at the windows, sending dense black smoke into the sky as workers fled for their lives, many down steel ladders reaching up from fire trucks below. Others jumped out of the windows.

The next day, police barricaded the building, to keeping onlookers at bay. At least five fire fighting vehicles were at the site on Wednesday, although none were in use.

The fire killed 60 people and injured 90 more.

Two welders were later arrested for causing the fire. They had been working at the disco on the second floor, and it was suspected that sparks from their equipment may have started the blaze. Along with their supervisor and their employer, they were charged with "violating regulations of fire prevention and combating". They were found guilty, and the court imposed sentences of 2 to 7 years in prison.

== International reaction ==
Chinese Premier Zhu Rongji: "I am shocked to learn of the big fire that occurred in Ho Chi Minh City in Vietnam ... On behalf of the Chinese government and people, and in my own name, I extend my deepest sympathy and sincere condolences to you, and through you, to the bereft families."

European Union foreign policy chief Javier Solana: "Europe is shocked to hear about the inferno and whole Europe extends its deepest sympathies to the families of those, who lost their lives."

Pope John Paul II sent a message expressing condolences to the families of victims of the fire in Ho Chi Minh City.

U.S. President George W. Bush: "I am shocked to learn of the big fire that took the lives of so many innocent people in Ho Chi Minh City. Let us express our sympathy to the families of the victims."

Pakistan Information Minister Sheikh Rashid: "We offer our heartfelt sympathies to those who suffered due to the inferno."

== Reconstruction ==
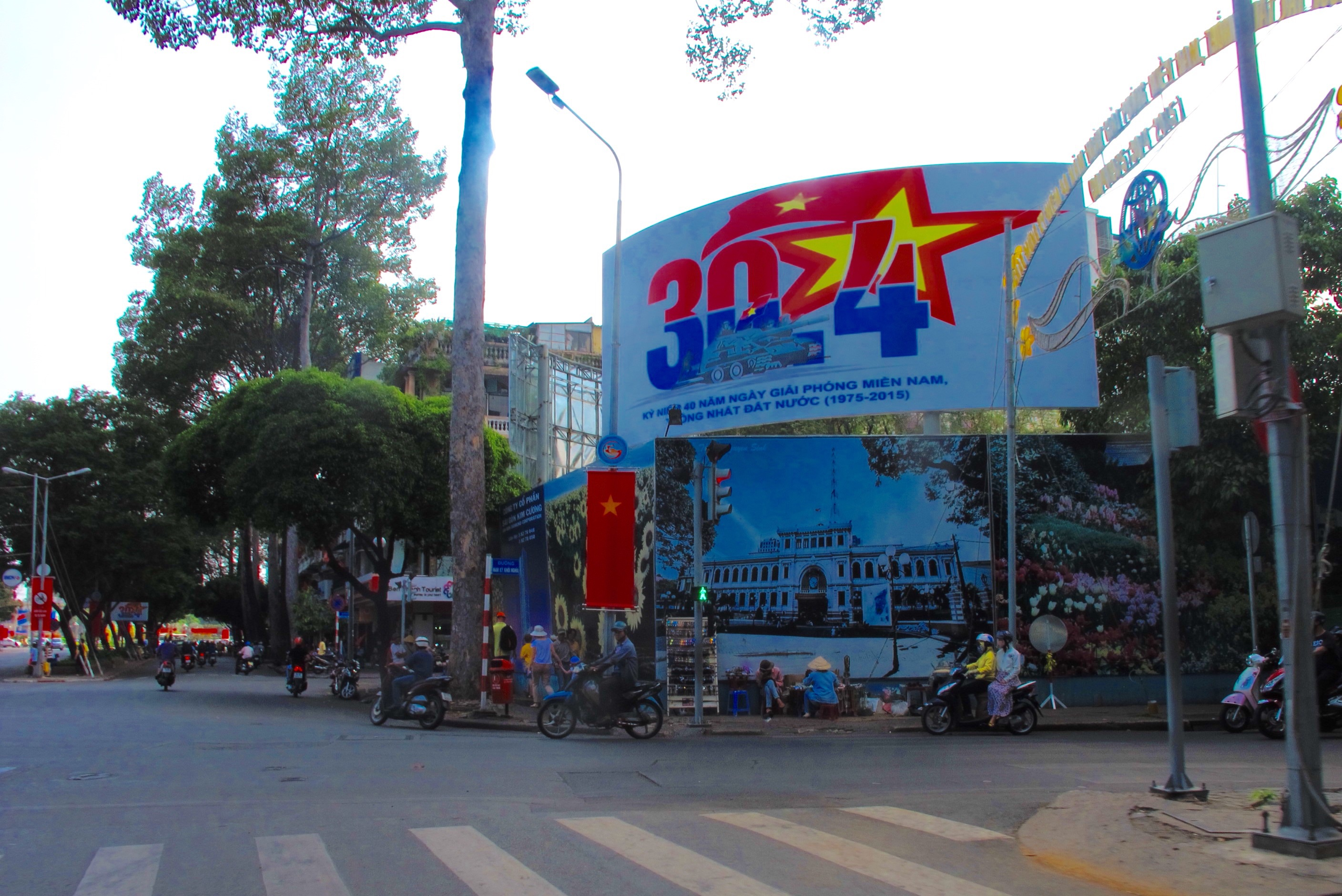
The place where was ITC building in 2015

The lot of the ITC after the event five years, was planned to build a 137 million USD 52-story complex skyscraper named SJC Tower in November 2007 and the construction was started in 2010, three years later. However, the building is still not built yet and currently it is still an empty lot, the project is also related to Vạn Thịnh Phát fraud case.

== See also ==
- 2023 Hanoi building fire
