= September 23rd Park =

Public park in Ho Chi Minh City, Vietnam

- Bến Thành Park
- Công viên 23 tháng 9
- September 23rd Park at night seen from New World Saigon Hotel
- Interactive map of September 23rd Park
- Type: Urban park
- Location: Bến Thành, Ho Chi Minh City
- Coordinates: 10.7694°N 106.6938°E
- Area: About 10 ha (25 acres) or less
- Public transit: L1 L2 L4 L12 Ben Thanh station, Thái Bình Market station (On planned, Line 1 Phase 2 only)

September 23rd Park (Vietnamese: Công viên 23 tháng 9), or written as 23/9 Park, is a 9 ha (22 acres) park in Bến Thành, District 1, Ho Chi Minh City. The park is located adjacent to Bến Thành Market the edge of the International Crossroad (backpacker area of Phạm Ngũ Lão – Bùi Viện), it mainly bordered by two streets of Phạm Ngũ Lão and Lê Lai on the side of south and north of the park, respectively, stretch from Quách Thị Trang Square to Thái Bình Market. It is a popular location for English-learning among Vietnamese locals.

== History ==
The park was built in the 1980s on land previously serving as the Saigon Railway Station. The park is named to commemorate September 23, 1945, marking the uprising against the French colonial government. In 2024, the Ho Chi Minh City People's Council approved the creation of the Southern Resistance Monument, to be completed in 2026.

In 2019, the city launched a competition to redesign the park.

== Description ==
Map of Phạm Ngũ Lão Ward with green space of September 23rd Park marked as green color area

September 23rd Park is divided into 3 sections A (stretch of Quách Thị Trang Square - Nguyễn Thị Nghĩa Street), B (Nguyễn Thị Nghĩa - Đỗ Quang Đẩu Street) and C (the rest):

- Section A: Green space and Bến Thành Central Metro Station Square
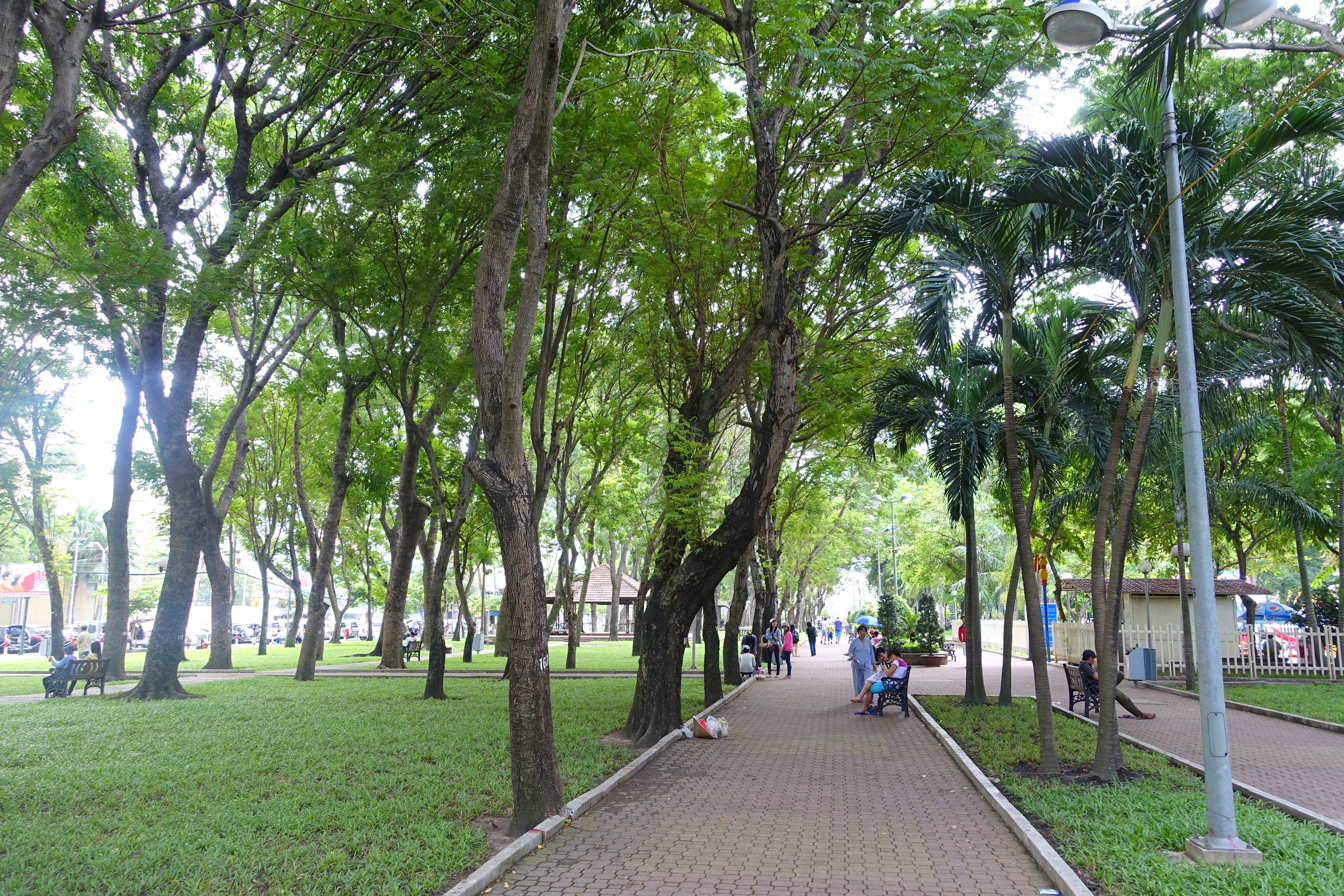
Playground area

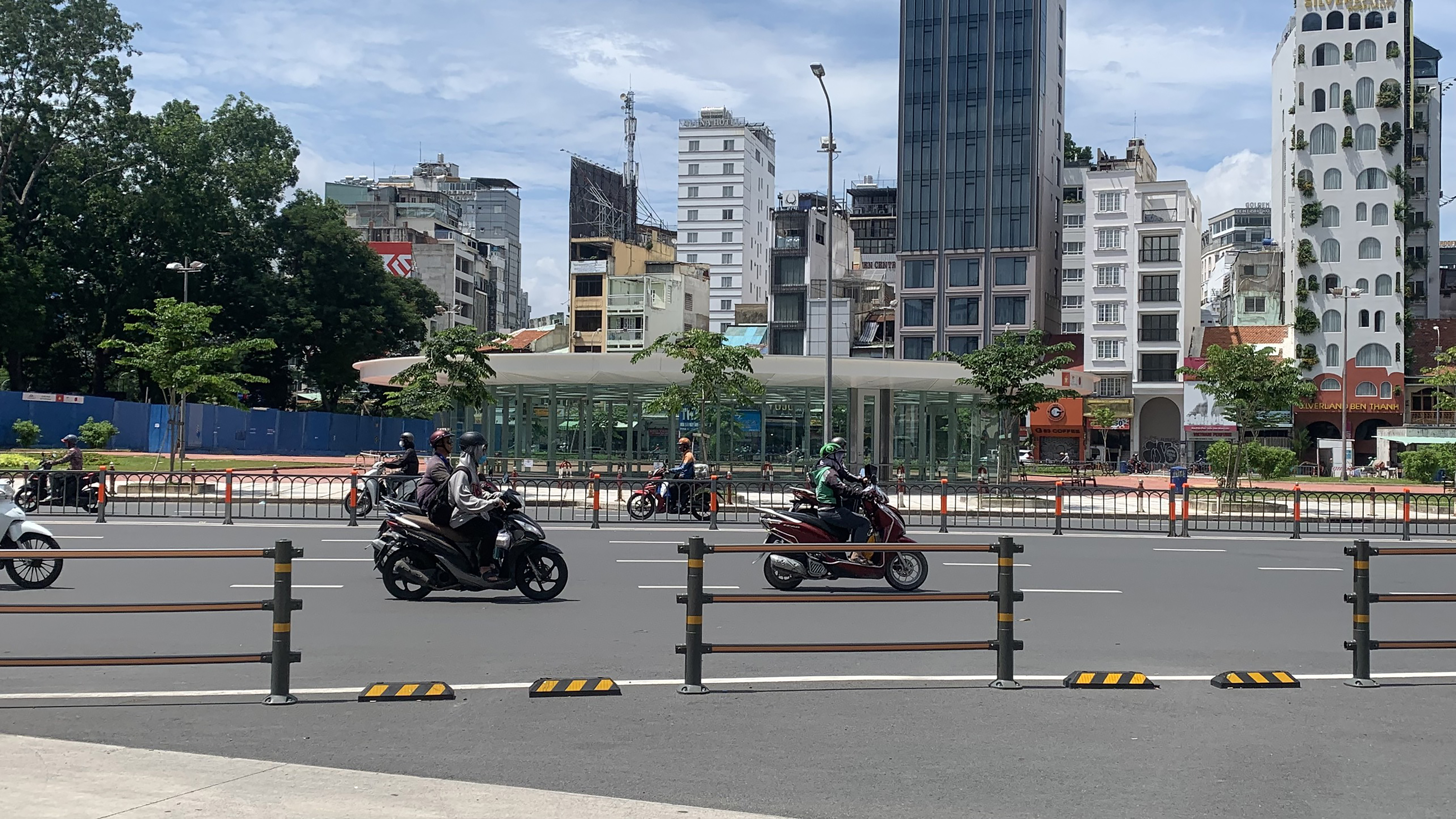
Section A of the park with Ben Thanh station skylight
- Section B: Commercial space, occupies half of the area, where festivals are held, underground Central Market for shopping and a temporary inactive Lotus Performative Arts Outdoor Theatre (Sân khấu Sen Hồng) for public shows, Ho Chi Minh City Visitor Information and Support Center also here. The rest are green space with a pond.
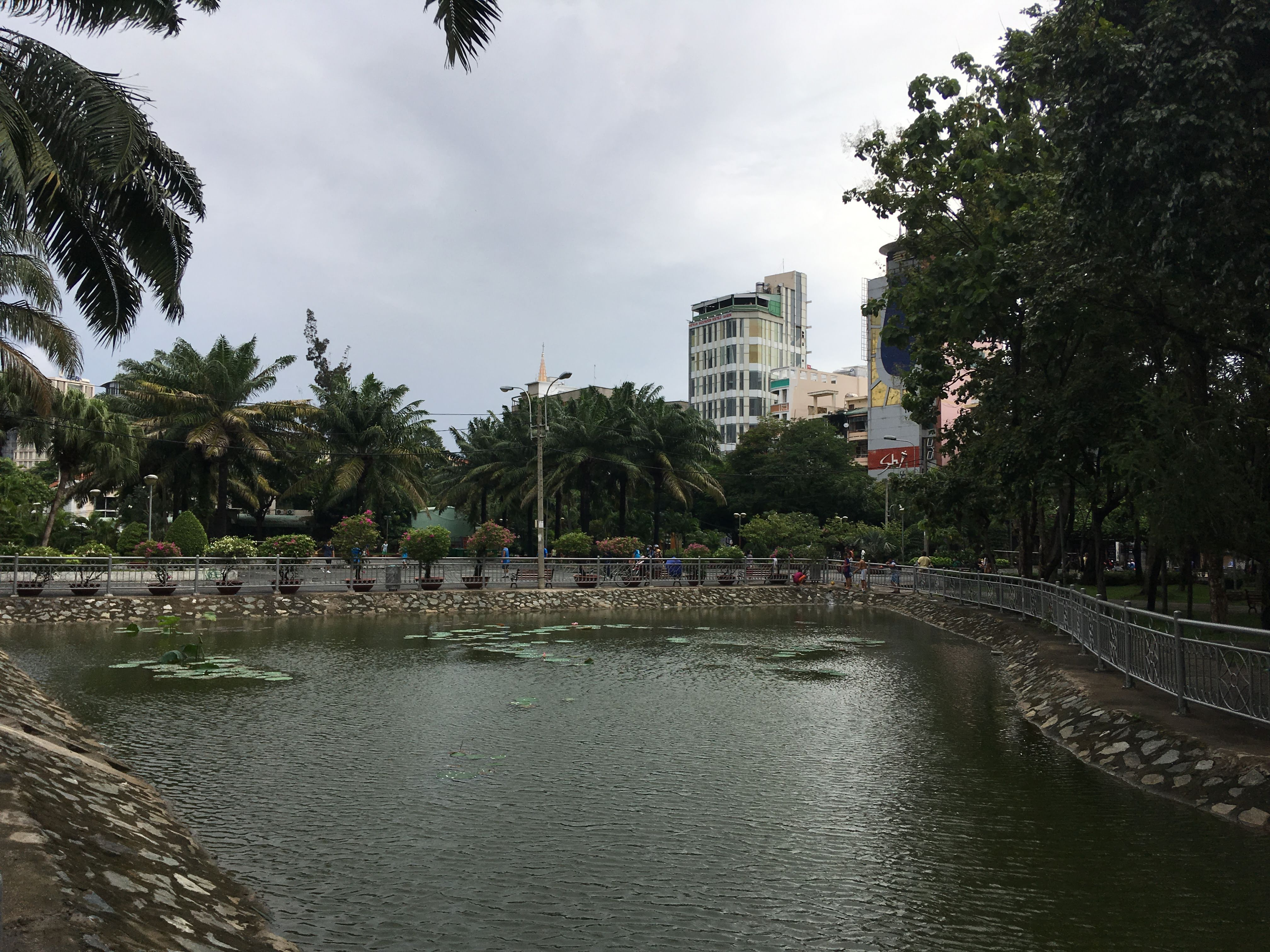
The pond in Section B

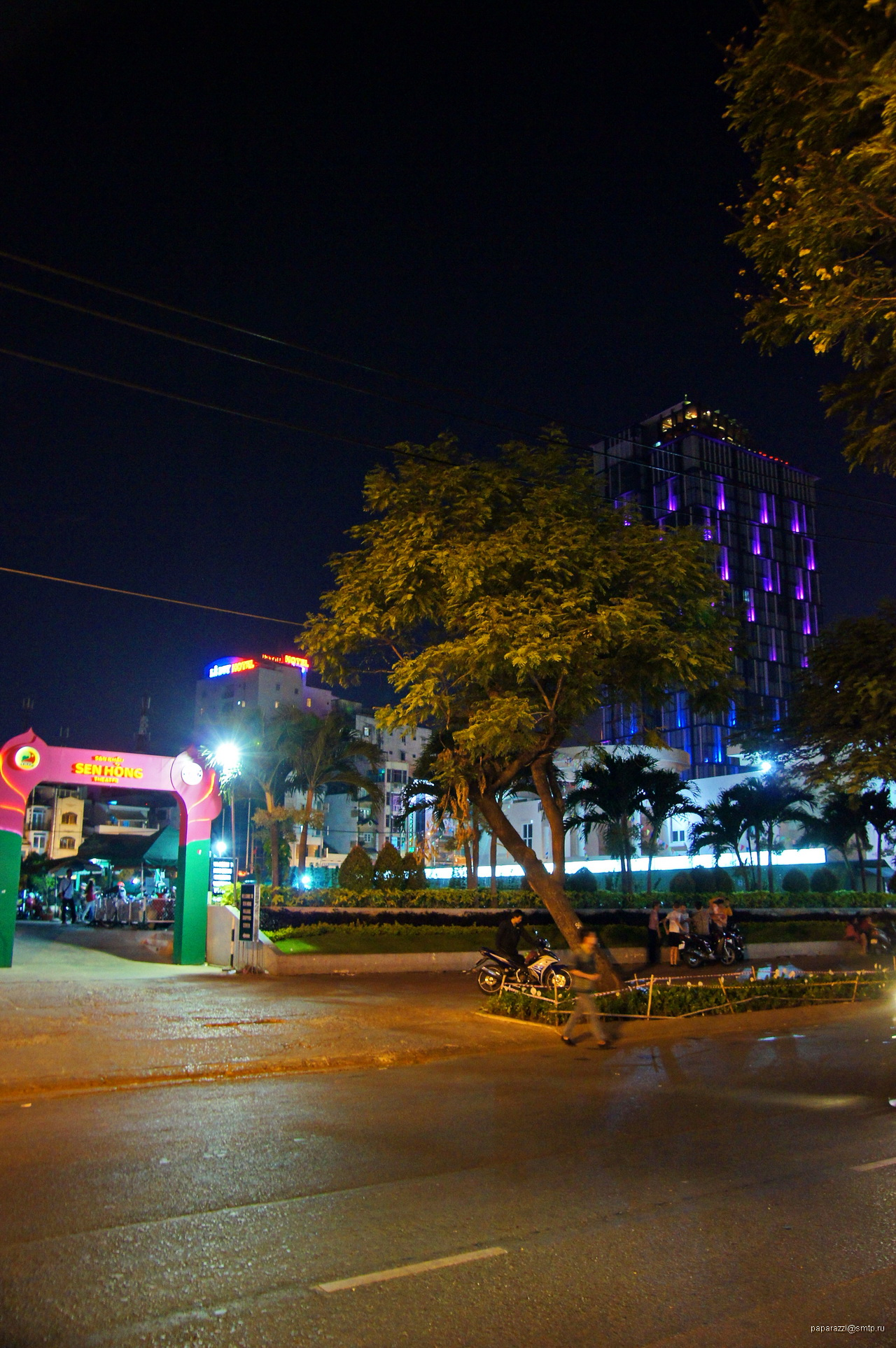
Back of former Sen Hồng Theater

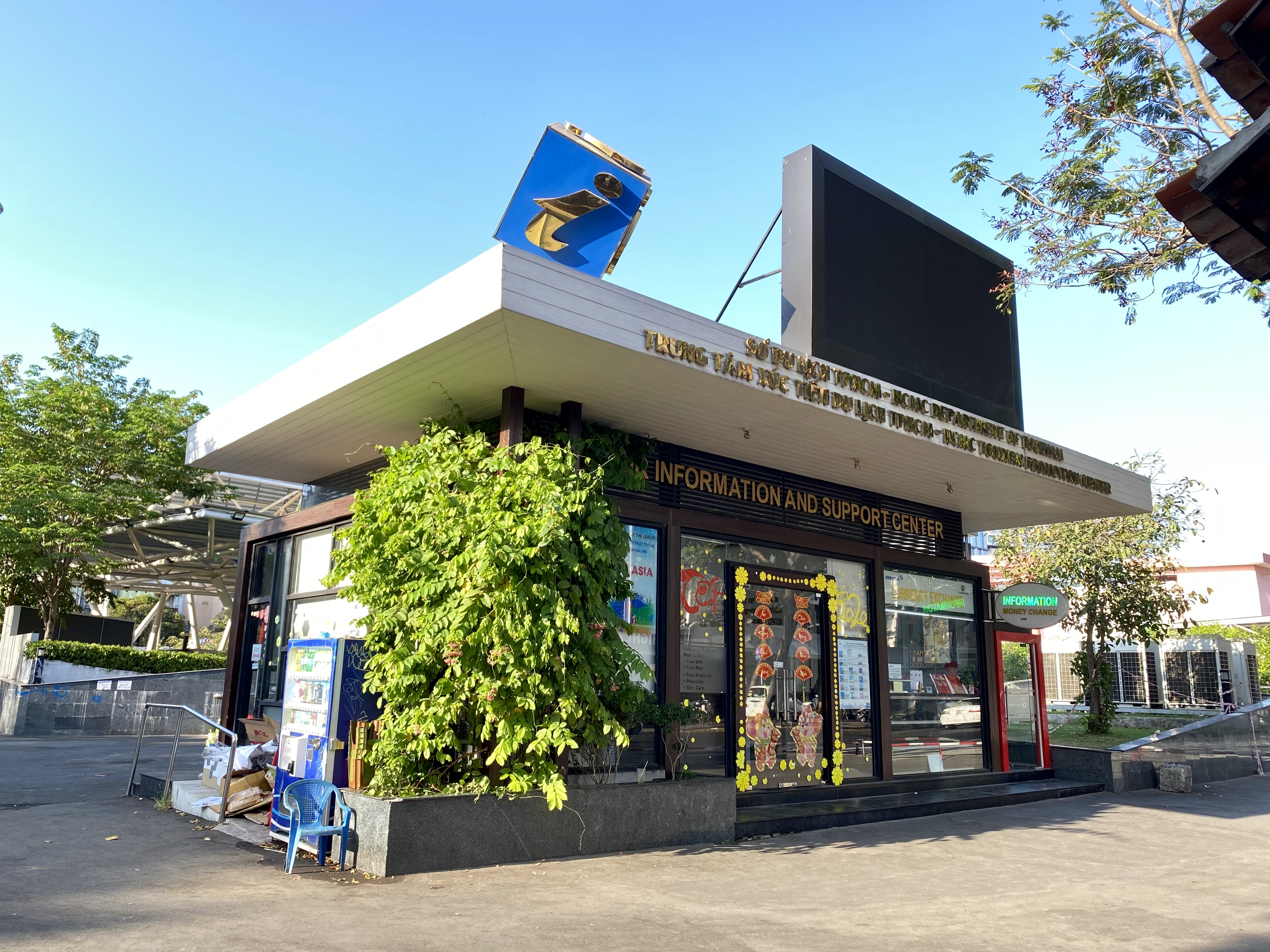
Ho Chi Minh City Visitor Information and Support Center
- Section C: Saigon Bus Station (Note: Not to be confused with the Saigon Operation Bus Station or Saigon Bus Transfer Station (Trạm Trung chuyển/Điều hành xe buýt Sài Gòn), which is also known as Bến Thành Bus Station near Bến Thành Market, now currently on Hàm Nghi Boulevard that causes to its other name as Hàm Nghi Bus Station)

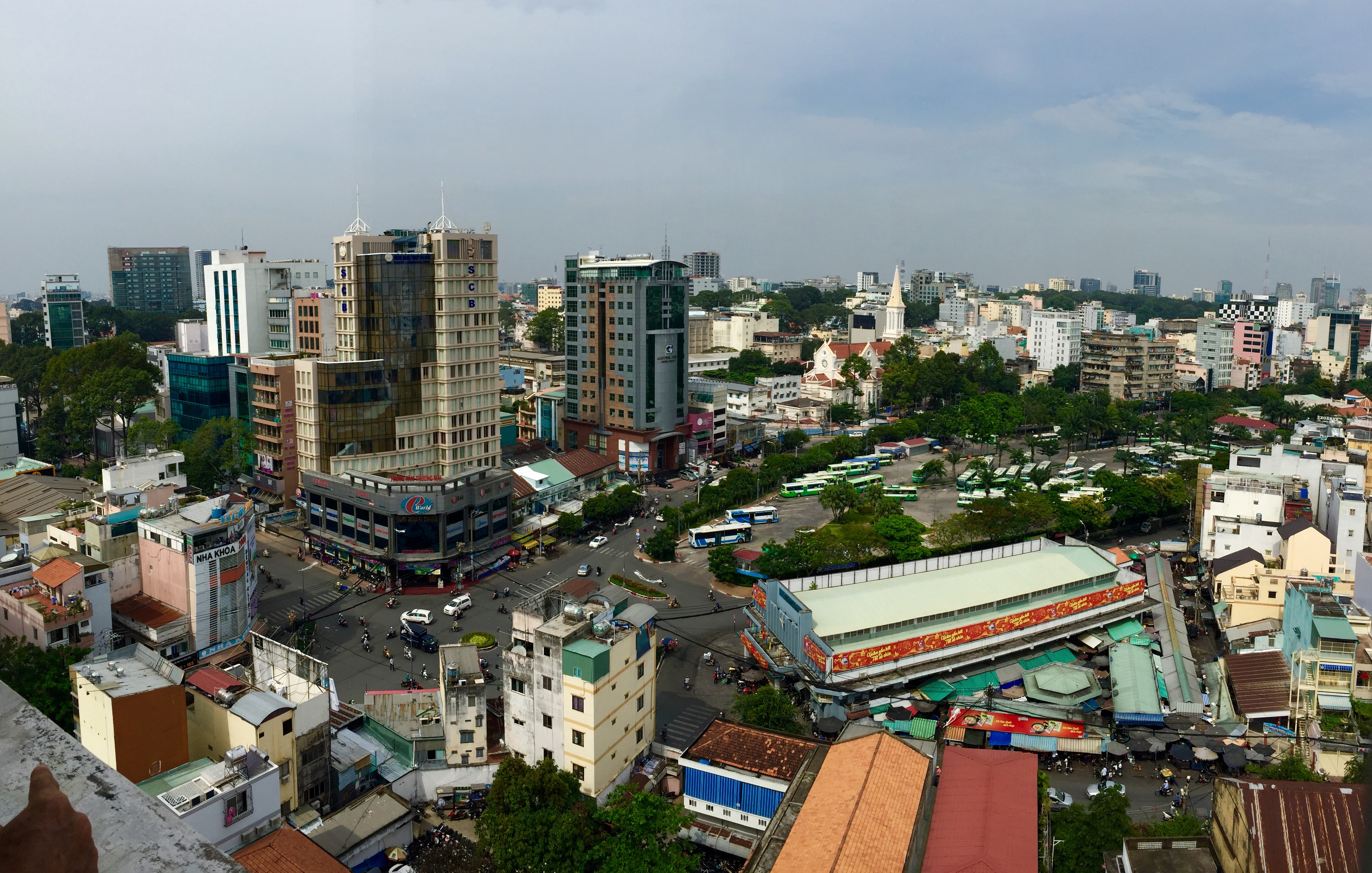
Section C at Cống Quỳnh Roundabout

== Transportation ==
Ben Thanh station on the Ho Chi Minh City Metro is located underneath the park, with services on Line 1 beginning 22 December 2024, it is now being expanded to serves the other lines are Line 2, Line 4 and Line 12. Thái Bình Market station will be located under Section C (Saigon Bus Station) of the park, on the western extension of the Line 1 is also proposed.
