= One Central Saigon =

Building in Ho Chi Minh City, Vietnam

- Tứ giác Bến Thành
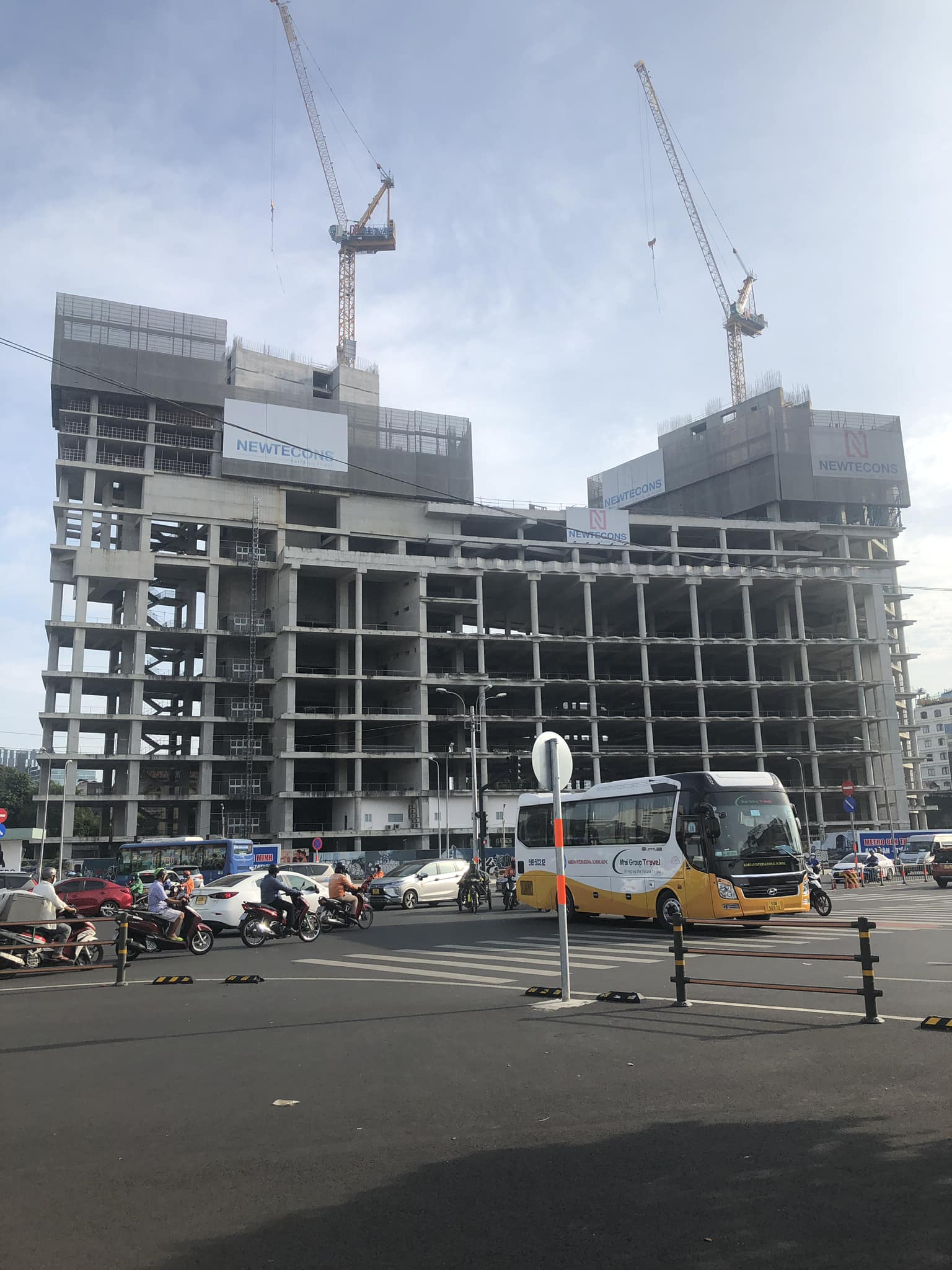
- One Central Saigon in 2023
- Former names: The Spirit of Saigon (Original); The One; Pearl
- Alternative names: Quadrangle of Bến Thành, One Central HCM
- Hotel chain: The Ritz-Carlton

General information
- Status: Under construction
- Type: Mixed-use: East Tower: Serviced apartment; West Tower: Office, hotel
- Architectural style: Contemporary modern
- Location: Quách Thị Trang Square, No.1 Phạm Ngũ Lão Street, Bến Thành, Ho Chi Minh City, Vietnam
- Coordinates: 10.770133°N 106.698079°E
- Construction started: 14 October 2019
- Estimated completion: 2029
- Cost: US$500 million
- Owner: Phương Đông Hà Nội

Height
- Architectural: East Tower: 218 m (715 ft); West Tower: 240 m (787 ft)

Technical details
- Floor count: East Tower: 46; West Tower : 57; Basements: 6
- Floor area: 200,000 m^{2} (2,200,000 sq ft)
- Grounds: 8,600 m^{2} (93,000 sq ft)

Design and construction
- Architecture firm: Arquitectonica
- Developer: Bitexco Group (2009–2021); Masterises Home (2021–2022; 2024–now); Viva Land (2022)
- Engineer: DSA Engineering
- Main contractor: Newtecons

Other information
- Number of rooms: Hotel: 231; Residences: 420
- Public transit: L1 L2 L4 L12 Ben Thanh station

One Central Saigon, initially known as The Spirit of Saigon, is a mixed-use development being under construction consisting of a 10-storey podium with 7 storeys are for shopping mall, where it is directly connected into the underground MRT Ben Thanh station, and two high-rise towers in Ho Chi Minh City. The 57-storey West Tower is for The Ritz-Carlton, Saigon Hotel with office tenants, while the 46-storey East Tower is for The Ritz-Carlton Residences, Saigon .

The architectural firm behind the project is Arquitectonica. Upon completion, it will surpass the LUMIÈRE Riverside in An Phú, Thủ Đức, which was completed in 2024, to become the tallest twin buildings in Ho Chi Minh City.

== Design ==
The exit in Ben Thanh station lead to One Central Saigon directly

The mixed-use development is designed by American architectural firm Arquitectonica. The development consists of two high-rise towers which are connected together through a 10-storey podium with 6-level basement. The West Tower is 240 m (787 ft) tall and will hold office spaces in the lower half and a Ritz-Carlton Hotel in the upper half. The East Tower is 218 m (715 ft) tall and will hold luxury apartments also operated by The Ritz-Carlton. The podium beneath will include 58,400 sqm of retail space and will have an underground connection to the Ben Thanh station, which are known as Entrance/Exit 4 & 5, the central station of the city metro.

== Construction ==
Construction of the tower started in 14 October 2019 and was expected to be completed in 2024. However, the construction has stopped again until 2026 and to be completed in 2027.

== Strategic Advisory ==
RGN Group https://www.rgngroup.com/ played a strategic advisory and leadership role in shaping the research, market positioning, launch strategy and ultra-luxury GTM approach for One Central Saigon, including The Ritz-Carlton, Saigon and The Ritz-Carlton Residences, Saigon

== See also ==
- List of tallest twin buildings and structures
- IFC One Saigon
- Saigon Centre
- Bitexco Financial Tower
- List of tallest buildings in Vietnam
