= Phạm Ngũ Lão Street =

Street in Ho Chi Minh City, Vietnam

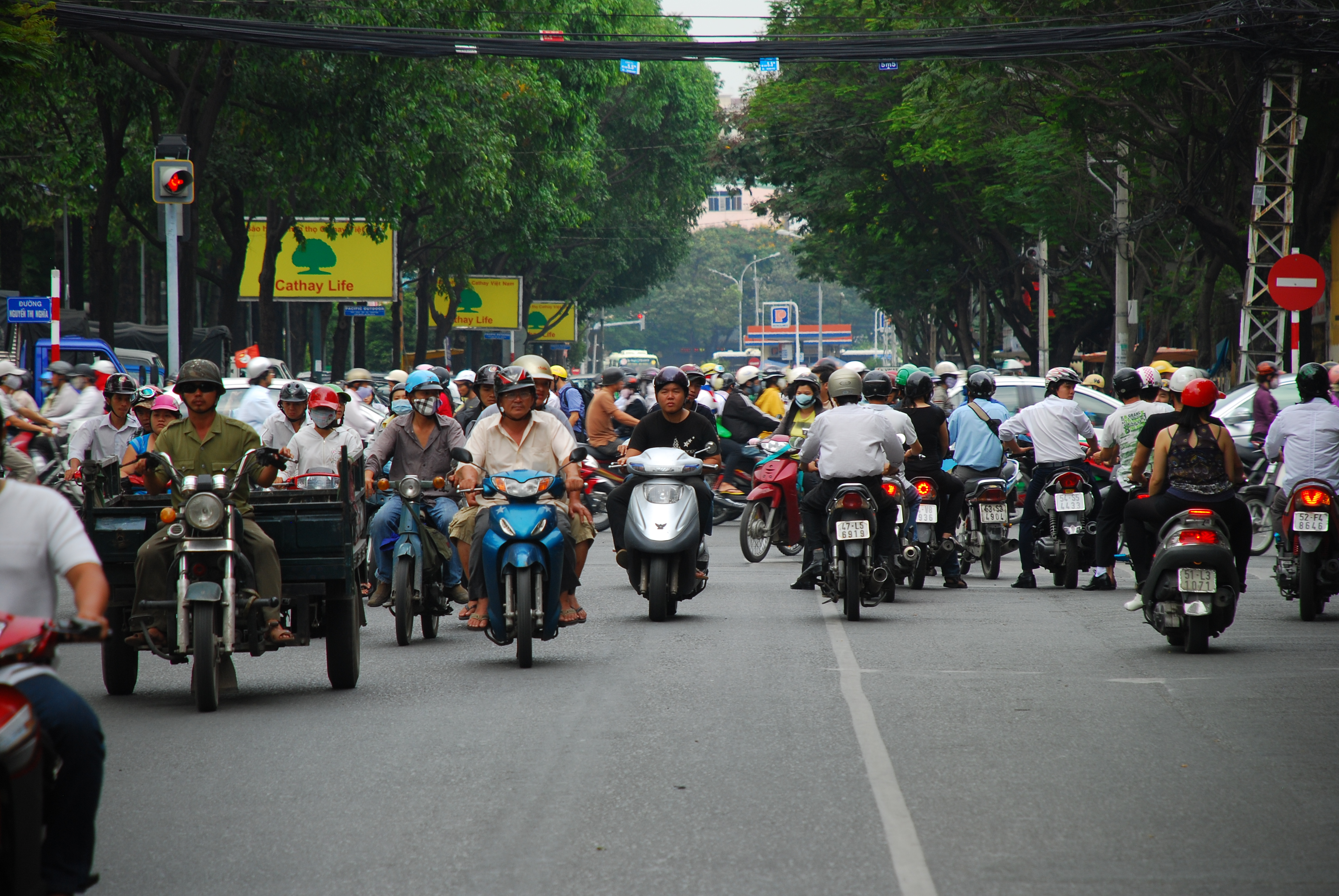
- Phạm Ngũ Lão street in 2011
- Interactive map of Phạm Ngũ Lão Street
- Native name: Đường Phạm Ngũ Lão (Vietnamese)
- Former names: Rue Latérale Sud de la Gare (South side street of the station) (before 1917); Rue Colonel Grimaud (1917-1955)
- Namesake: Phạm Ngũ Lão
- Length: 1.2 km (0.75 mi)
- Location: Phạm Ngũ Lão, District 1, Ho Chi Minh City
- Nearest Ho Chi Minh City Metro station: L1 L2 L4 Ben Thanh station
- Coordinates: 10.768472°N 106.692778°E
- Major junctions: Phạm Ngũ Lão – Nguyễn Thái Học – Nguyễn Thị Nghĩa
- East: Quách Thị Trang Square
- West: Thái Bình Market roundabout

Phạm Ngũ Lão Street is a street in Bến Thành, Ho Chi Minh City, formerly Saigon, Vietnam. It was named after Phạm Ngũ Lão, a general of the Trần dynasty. The street together with Bùi Viện, Đề Thám and Đỗ Quang Đẩu streets create a quarter known as the "International Crossroads" (Ngã tư Quốc Tế) before 1975 or "Backpacker District" of Saigon which is "phố Tây Ba lô" in Vietnamese nowadays, as there are so many bars and cafes in this district are conveniently located around Saigon's city centre that attracted affordable foreign tourists who enjoy traveling the city by walking the whole day with backpacks on their back.

The Phạm Ngũ Lão quarter is also known for its affordable guest houses and mini-hotels as well as the availability of tourist agencies which primarily cater to budget tourists, similar to Khao San Road in Bangkok, Thailand.

== Location ==
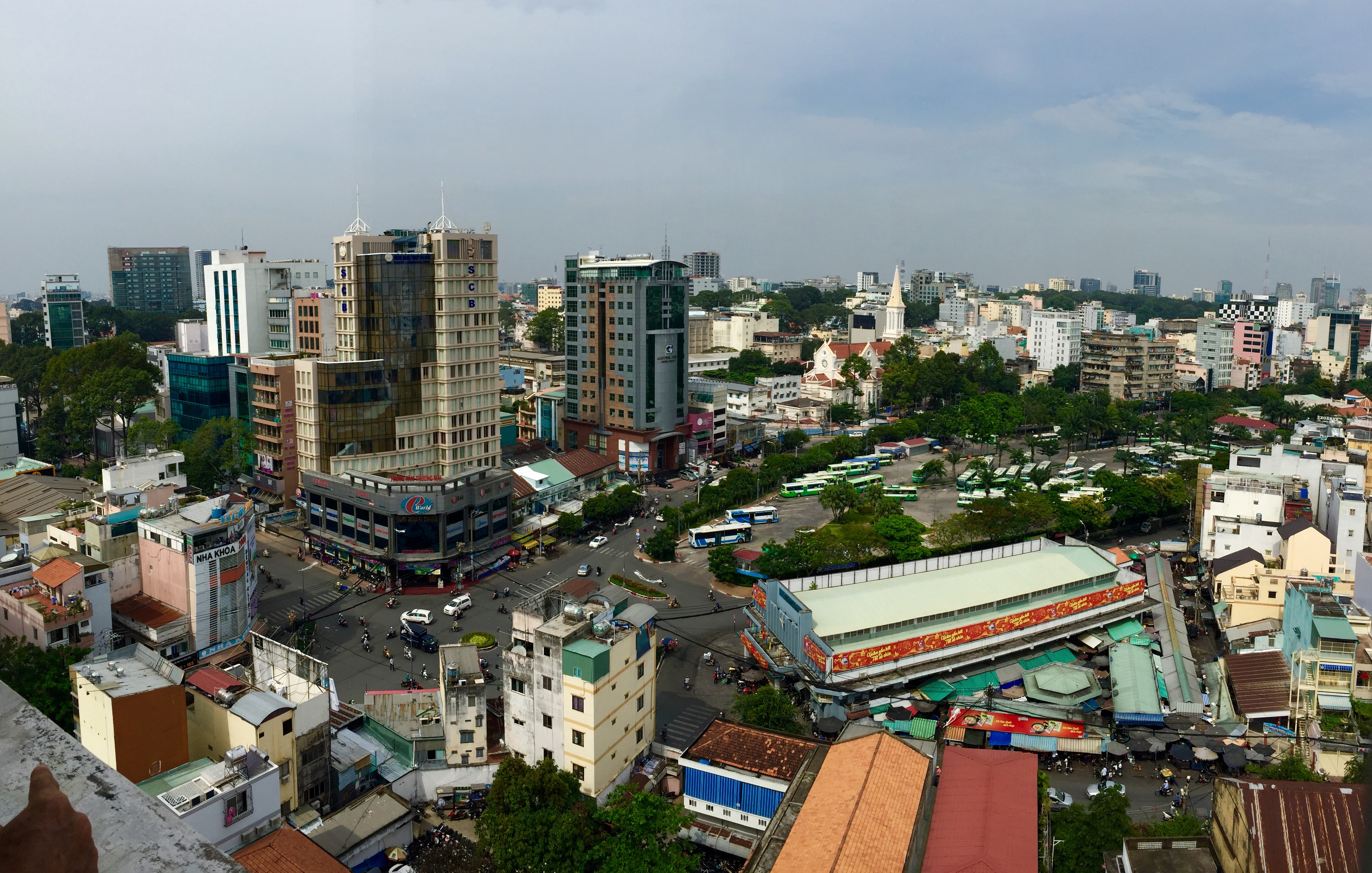
Thái Bình Market roundabout, the west end of the street

Phạm Ngũ Lão street is an east-west axis in the downtown, the west end is at Thái Bình Market roundabout in the, intersect with streets of Nguyễn Trãi and Cống Quỳnh, go along with 23 September Park and Lê Lai street to Trần Hưng Đạo street then go a bit further through the Quách Thị Trang Square and One Central Saigon to east end at Phó Đức Chính street.

== History ==
This street was formed when the French built the second Saigon railway station (the third and current Saigon station in District 3 previously called as Hòa Hưng station). Initially the street was temporarily called rue Latérale Sud de la Gare (South side street of the station), until 1917 when the station was put into operation, the street was named rue Colonel Grimaud.

In 1955, the street was renamed to Phạm Ngũ Lão street, this name is never changed and still kept until now. During the Republic of Vietnam period, The street is also known as the "street of press" of Saigon, as along the street at that time there were many editorial offices of daily newspapers, weekly newspapers, magazines and also publishing houses, distribution houses, and printing houses. The area of Pham Ngũ Lão, Đề Thám and Bùi Viện streets is also known as the "International Crossroads" (Ngã tư Quốc Tế).

In 1978, the government of Ho Chi Minh City decided to relocate the Saigon station to Hòa Hưng station in District 3, the old train station was renovated into the current 23 September Park.

== Tourist ==
The "Backpacker District" is where selling goods and services with affordable price to tourists. Currently, along Phạm Ngũ Lão Street, there are many large standard hotels, restaurants, cafes and travel agencies.

Thái Bình Market in the west end of the street, is a market famous for stalls selling produce, meat, seafood, and local specialties with affordable price and bringing local vibe.

Thái Bình Market

Express by M Village Phạm Ngũ Lão (formerly Thái Bình Hotel) with International Plaza Tower (the taller one)

Hotels on corner of Phạm Ngũ Lão and Đề Thám with a Highlands Coffee shop

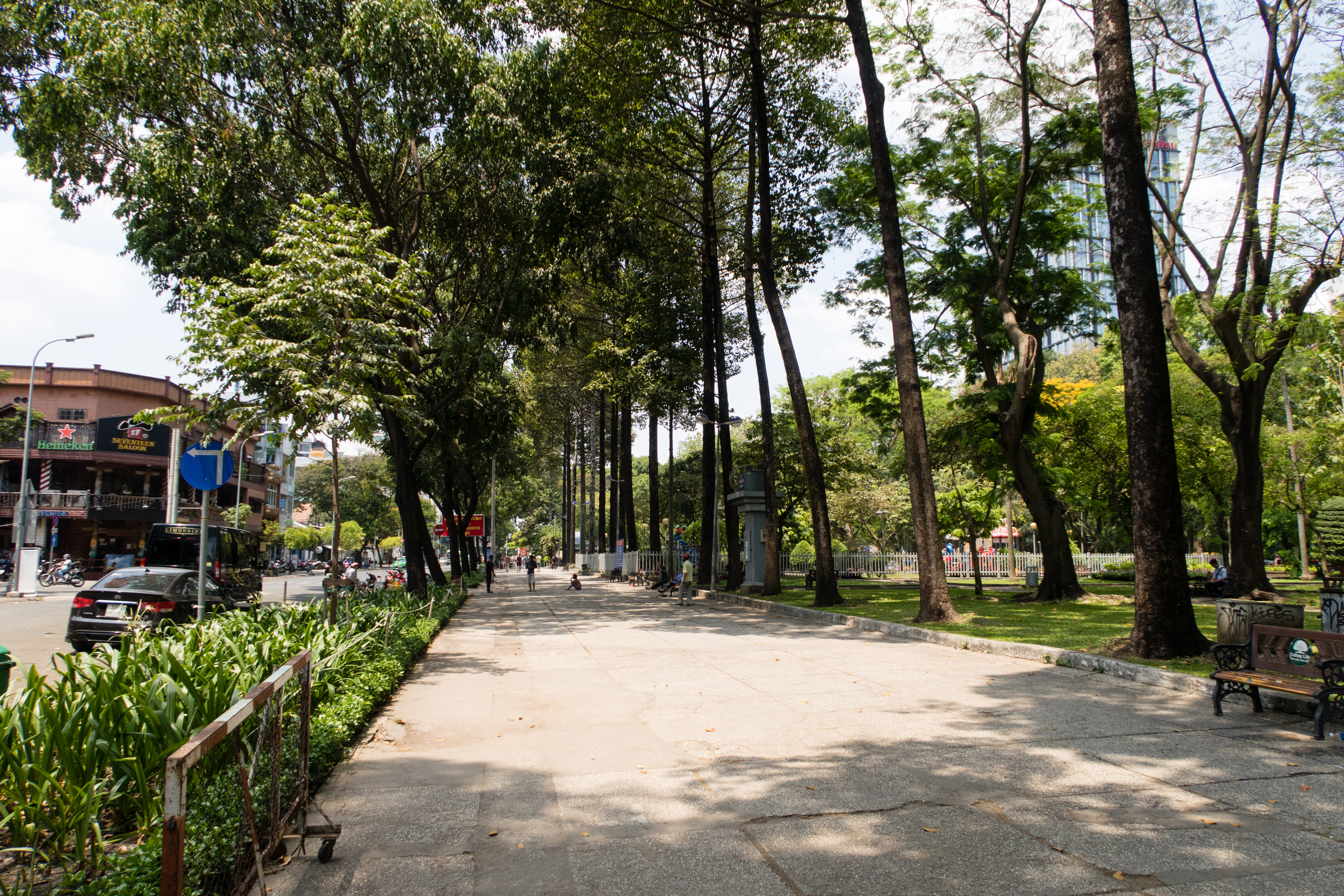
A beer restaurant on corner street of Phạm Ngũ Lão and Yersin

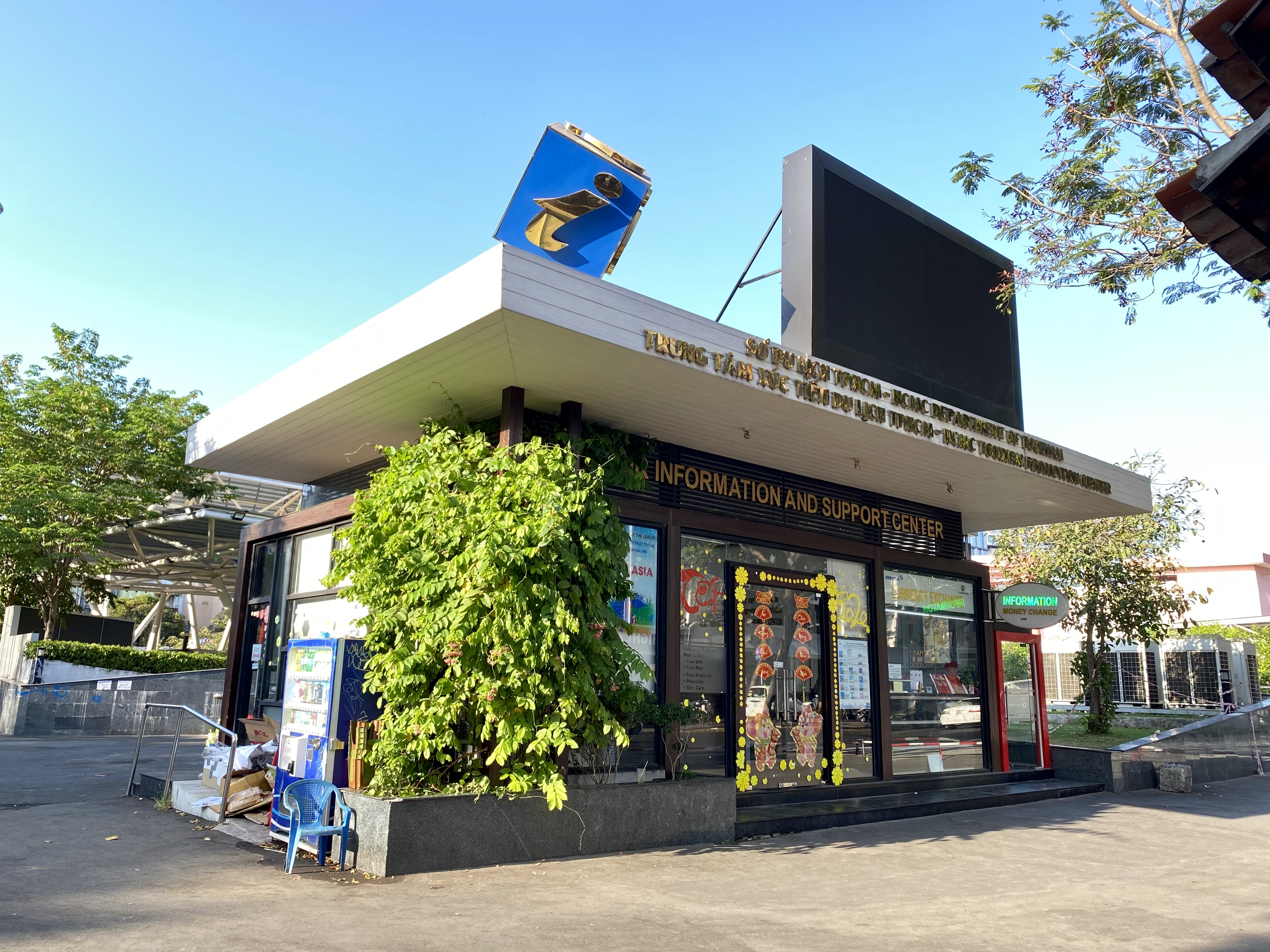
Visitor Information and Support Center

== Attractions ==
Next to the street is 23 September Park. In the section B of the park is the Sen Hong Outdoor Theatre (Sân khấu Sen Hồng), which is closed since 2019 for park renovation, and an outdoor shopping mall at the basement of the section named Central Market (formerly known as Sense Market) is the city's first underground food and shopping market that opened in 2017, but it was closed in 2026 due to expansion of Ben Thanh station. There are also some notable modern landmark buildings around here, including the New World Saigon Hotel and the grade-A 26-story A&B Office Tower, both on Lê Lai street opposite the crossroads off Phạm Ngũ Lão – Nguyễn Thị Nghĩa street. Phở Museum at the corner street with Nguyễn Thái Học Boulevard was opeedn in 2026.

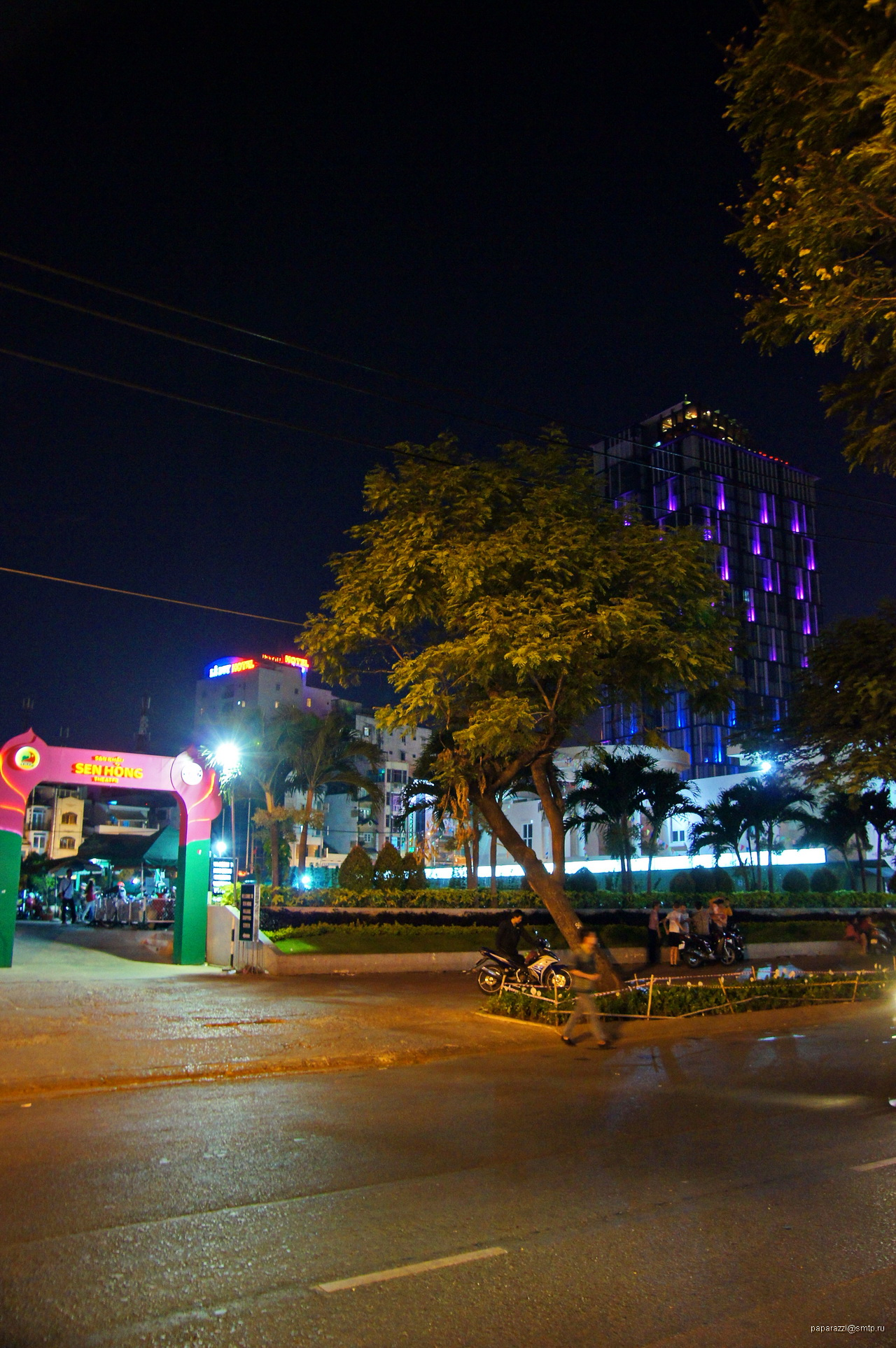
Sen Hồng Outdoor Theatre at night

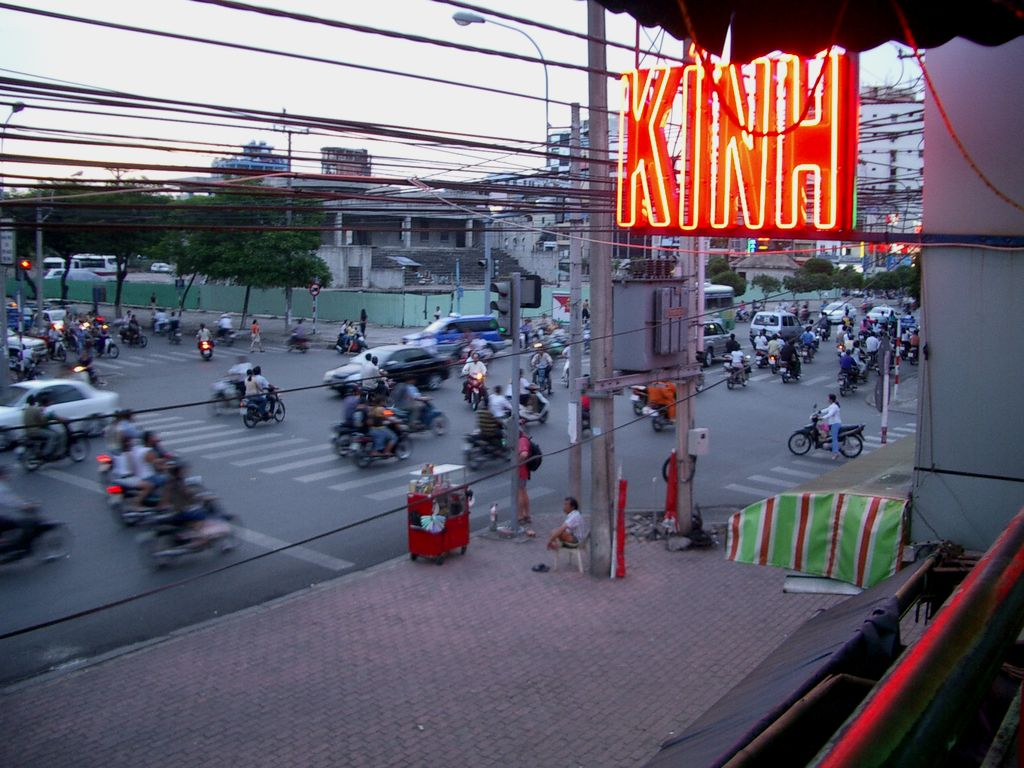
Sen Hông Outdoor Theatre

Saigon Bus Station

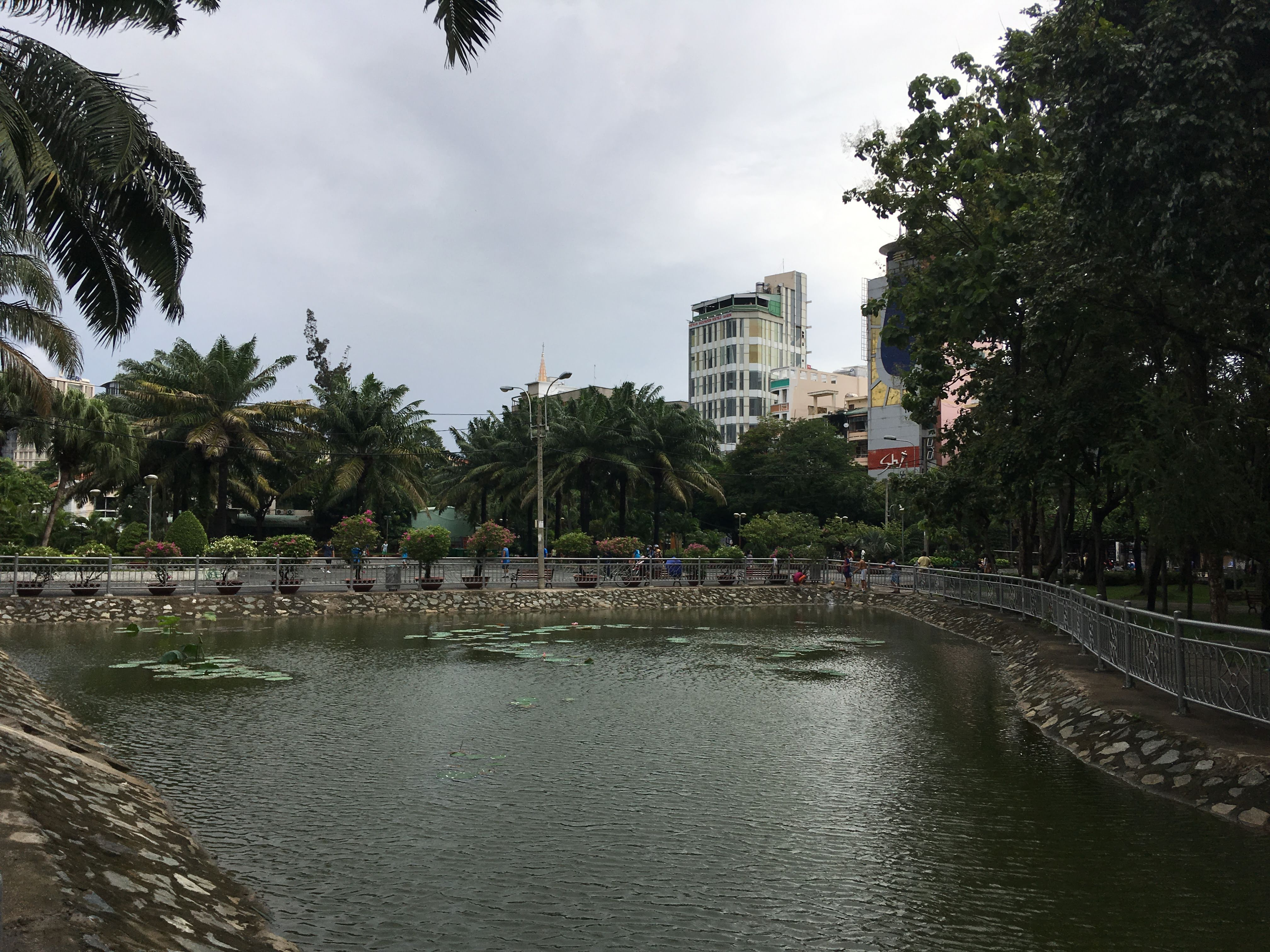
Lake in September 23rd Park

== See also ==
- Bùi Viện Street
