= Hàm Nghi Boulevard =

Boulevard in Ho Chi Minh City, Vietnam

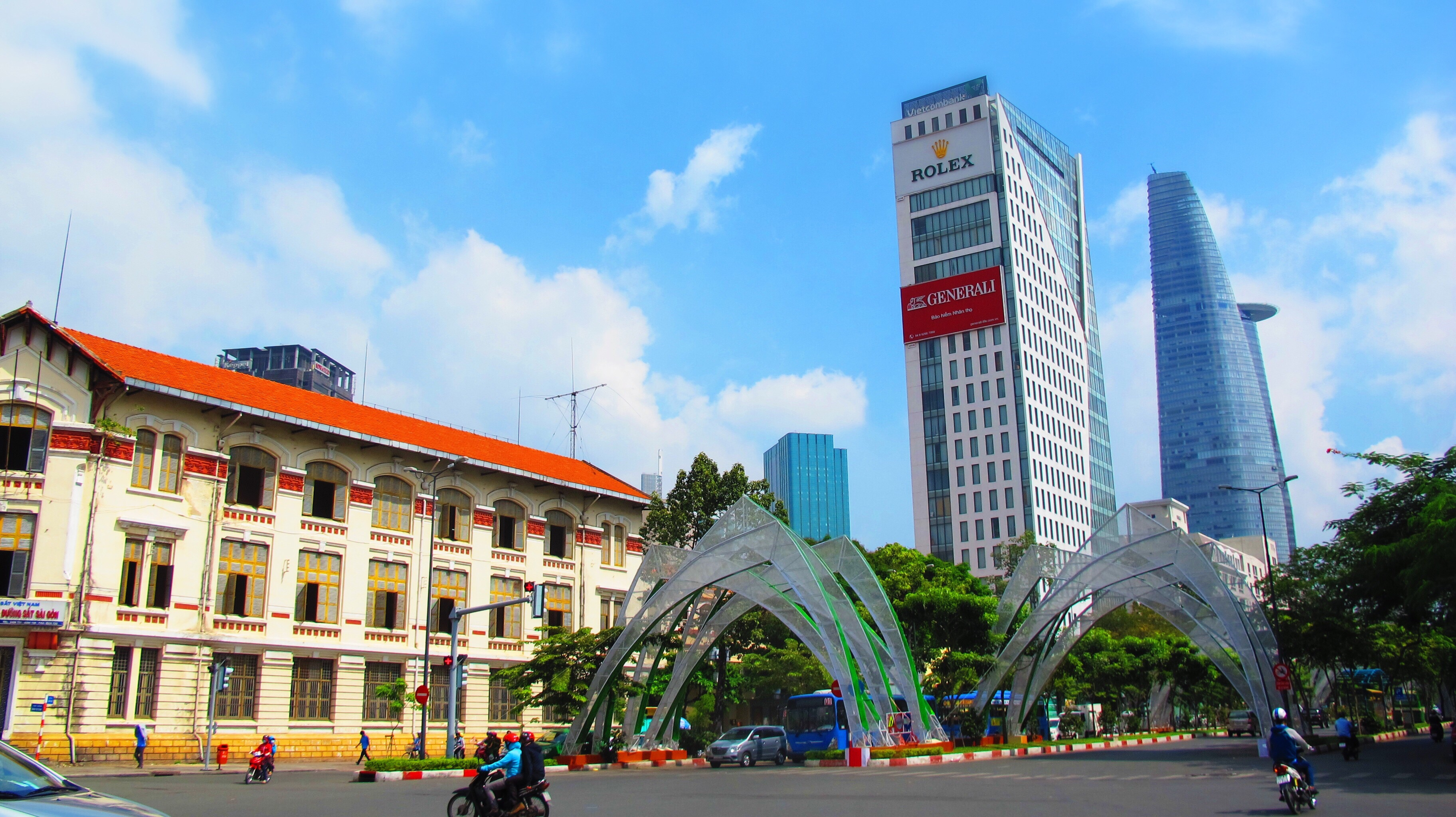
- Ham Nghi Boulevard in 2014
- Interactive map of Hàm Nghi Boulevard
- Native name: Đường Hàm Nghi, Đại lộ Hàm Nghi (Vietnamese)
- Former names: Boulevard de Canton, Boulevard de la Somme
- Namesake: Emperor Hàm Nghi
- Owner: Ho Chi Minh City
- Length: 800 m (2,600 ft)
- Location: District 1, Ho Chi Minh City
- Nearest metro station: Ben Thanh station; Hàm Nghi station (planned)
- Coordinates: 10°46′15″N 106°42′11″E
- East end: Tôn Đức Thắng Boulevard
- Major junctions: Hồ Tùng Mậu Street; Tôn Thất Đạm Street; Pasteur Street; Nam Kỳ Khởi Nghĩa Street; Phó Đức Chính Street
- West end: Quách Thị Trang Square

Hàm Nghi Boulevard (Vietnamese: Đường Hàm Nghi, Đại lộ Hàm Nghi) is an east–west boulevard in District 1, central district of Ho Chi Minh City, Vietnam. The boulevard stretches from Tôn Đức Thắng Boulevard (Bạch Đằng Quay, Saigon River waterfront) to the Quách Thị Trang Square (in front of the Bến Thành Market). The thoroughfare is also part of the Financial District, Saigon.

== History ==
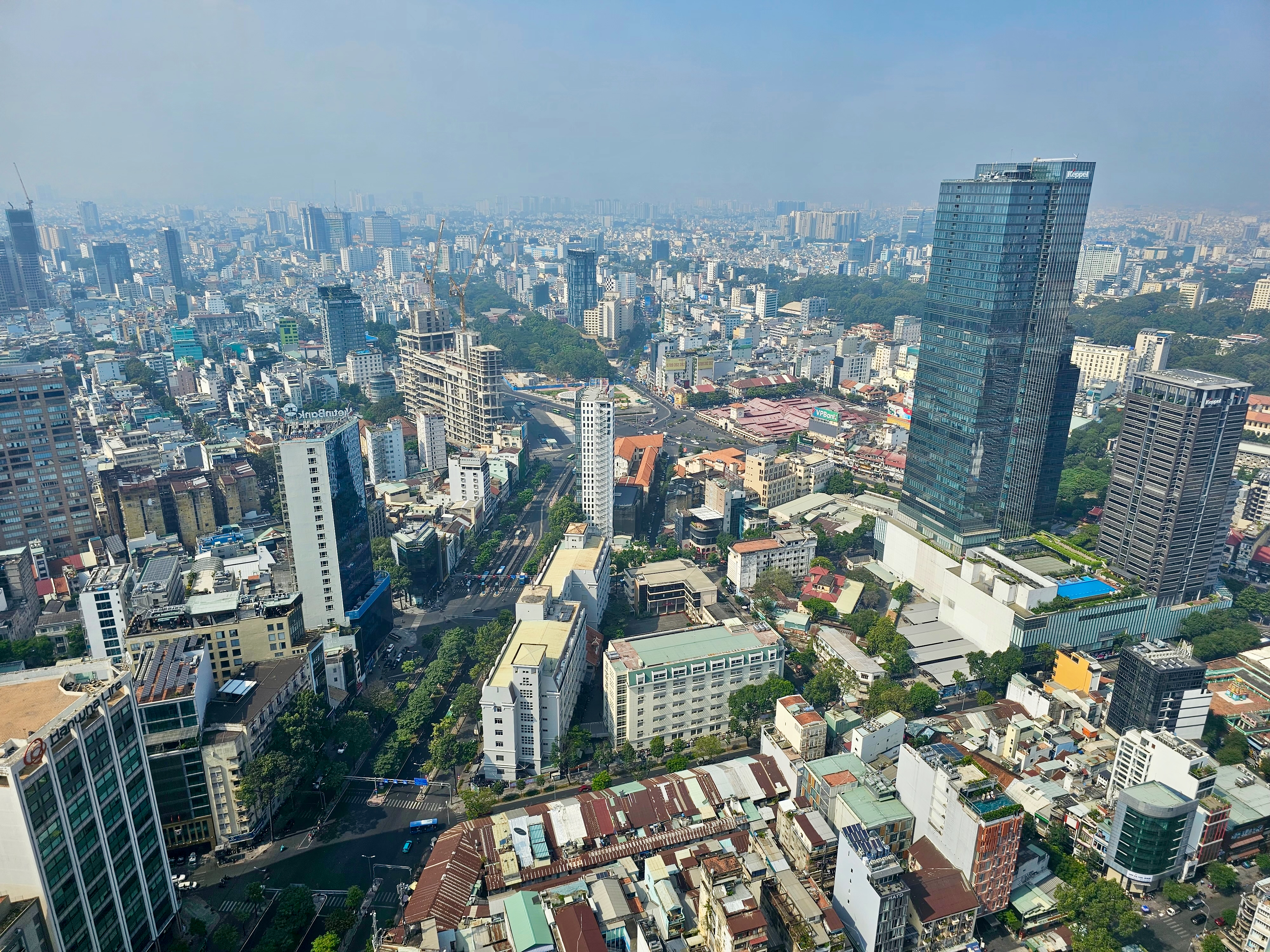
Hàm Nghi Boulevard and its west end, Quách Thị Trang Square viewed from Saigon Skydeck of Bitexco Financial Tower

The boulevard was originally a waterway known in Vietnamese as rạch Cầu Sấu (translating to "Crocodile Bridge creek"). According to scholar Pétrus Ký, the creek got its name as there was once a crocodile reservoir in the area, where crocodiles were bred for meat.

Following the French conquest of Saigon, the streets on both sides of the creek were first designated by n° 3, then they were given the names rue Dayot and rue de Canton, respectively. The waterway was later filled in and then by a decree dated 14 May 1877, the two streets were given a single name: boulevard de Canton. In the 1880s, the Saigon–My Tho railway line was built along the center of the boulevard. On 24 February 1897, the municipal council decided to split the boulevard into two separate streets on either side of the railway track, each named after a French admiral: rue Krantz on the northern side and rue Duperré on the southern side. Then again on 22 April 1920, after the relocation of the railway terminus to the area occupied today by September 23 Park, the municipal council decided to resume the name "boulevard" for the streets, and the name boulevard de la Somme was chosen, after the Battle of the Somme, one of the First World War's deadliest battles.

In 1955, the boulevard was renamed Hàm Nghi Boulevard by the government South Vietnam, after the former Emperor Hàm Nghi of the Nguyễn dynasty. The name has been kept until now.

== Notable buildings ==
Hàm Nghi Boulevard is one of the most expensive streets of Ho Chi Minh City with those notable buildings

Address	Name	Image	Primary tenants, users and notes
1–3 Hàm Nghi Blvd	IFC One Saigon	IFC One Saigon seen from Khánh Hội Bridge	Under construction, another address is 34A Tôn Đức Thắng Blvd. Originally invested by Saigon M&C Real Estate Company, a joint venture between Saigontourist and DongA Bank (now is Vikki Bank of HDBank) and named after the company, then changed as Saigon One Tower until VivaLand, a company related to Trương Mỹ Lan, has bought it and changed the façade of the building in 2022.
2 Hàm Nghi Blvd	Ho Chi Minh City Customs Department	Ho Chi Minh City Customs Department	The new 21-story building was built in 2018
32 Hàm Nghi Blvd	BIDV Hàm Nghi Branch		Previously was place of Franco-Chinese Bank then Mekong Housing Bank until it was merged into Bank for Investment and Development of Vietnam
37–39 Hàm Nghi Blvd	Ho Chi Minh City University of Banking	Ho Chi Minh City University of Banking	Previously was the first place of Embassy of the United States, Saigon
79–79A Hàm Nghi	VietinBank Ho Chi Minh City Branch	VietinBank Ho Chi Minh City Branch	Previously place of Credit Commercial Bank of Vietnam in Republic Of Vietnam period
81–83–83B–85 Hàm Nghi Blvd	Doji Tower	Doji Tower then known as Continental Tower	Invested and inaugurated by Fideco Real Estate Developer in 2008. Its former names are: Fideco Tower, Continental Tower, Ruby Tower and Hanwha Life Building
93–95 Hàm Nghi Blvd	VietinBank Tower	VietinBank Tower Saigon	Also known as VietinBank Tower Saigon to distinguish with the VietinBank Business Center Office Tower in Hanoi, which also colloquially known as VietinBank Tower. Place of Ho Chi Minh City Branch 1 of the ban
2 Hải Triều Street	Bitexco Financial Tower	Bitexco Financial Building viewed from Hàm Nghi Blvd	The building is at the intersection of Hải Triều, Hàm Nghi and Hồ Tùng Mậu street. It was the tallest building in Vietnam until 2011
122–124–126–128 Hàm Nghi Blvd	Cao Thắng Technical College		Location of the Building F of the college, the main entrance is on 65 Huỳnh Thúc Kháng Street
132 Hàm Nghi Blvd	Havanna Tower	Havanna Tower	Also known as Havana Tower
136 Hàm Nghi Blvd	Saigon Railway Transport JSC Headquarter	Saigon Railway Transport JSC Headquarter	

== See also ==
- Lê Lợi Boulevard
- Nguyễn Huệ Boulevard
