= Ho Chi Minh University of Banking =

University in Ho Chi Minh City, Vietnam

Coordinates: 10.8584°N 106.7631°E

Ho Chi Minh University of Banking (HUB)
- Đại học Ngân hàng Thành phố Hồ Chí Minh
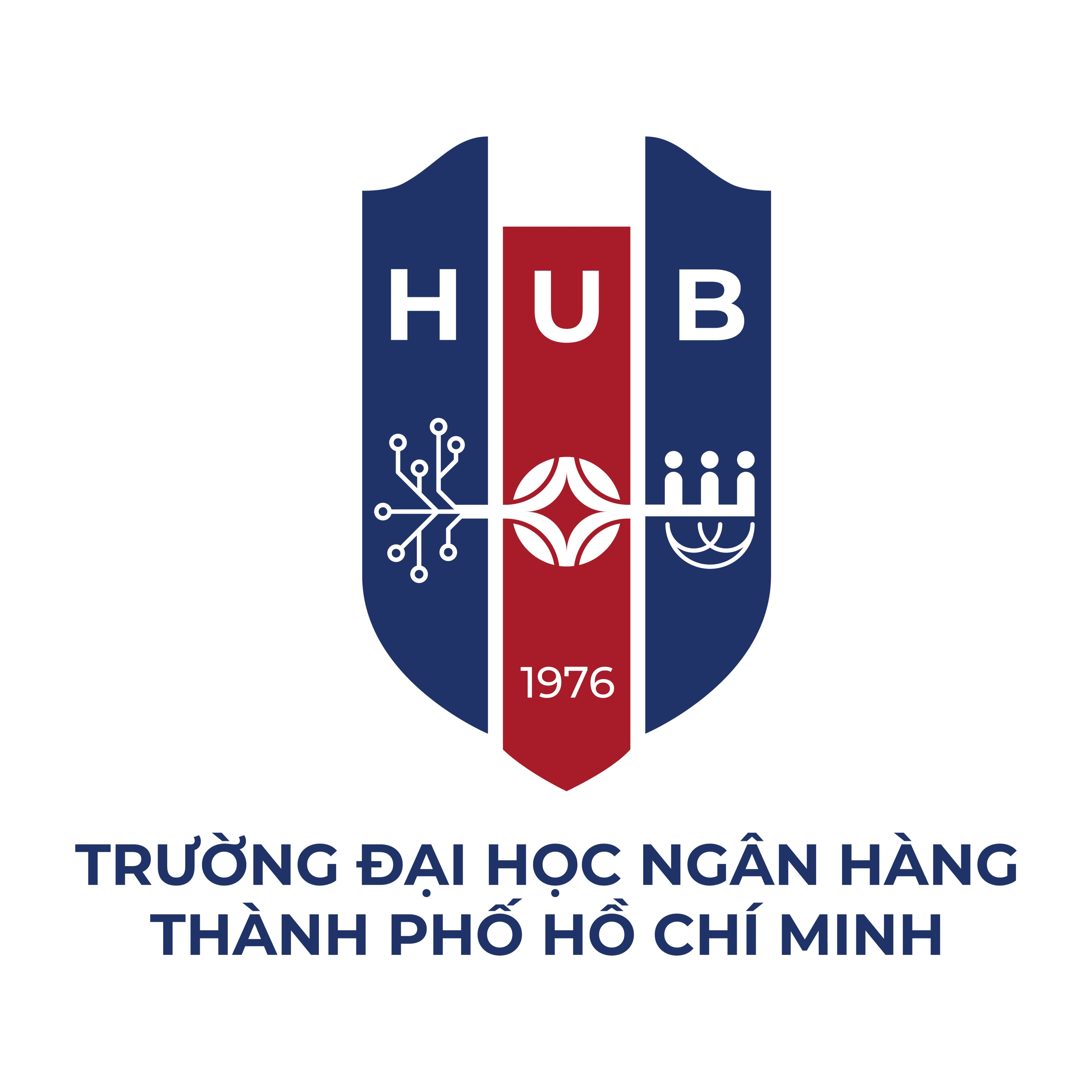
- Type: Public
- Established: 1976; 50 years ago
- Location: 36 Tôn Thất Đạm, Saigon, Ho Chi Minh City, Vietnam
- Campus: Urban
- Website: hub.edu.vn

Ho Chi Minh University of Banking (Vietnamese: Đại học Ngân hàng Thành phố Hồ Chí Minh) is a university in Ho Chi Minh City, Vietnam. The university provides graduate and postgraduate level education in finance, banking and business administration. There are five faculties: Finance, International Financial Market, International Finance and Banking, Financial Institutions Management, and Foreign Languages. There are 168 lecturers and professors, of which 30 are doctors, 50 are masters. The university main campus is at 36 Tôn Thất Đạm Street, District 1 with other campuses are at 39 Hàm Nghi Boulevard, District 1 and at 56 Hoàng Diệu 2 street, Thủ Đức, Ho Chi Minh City.

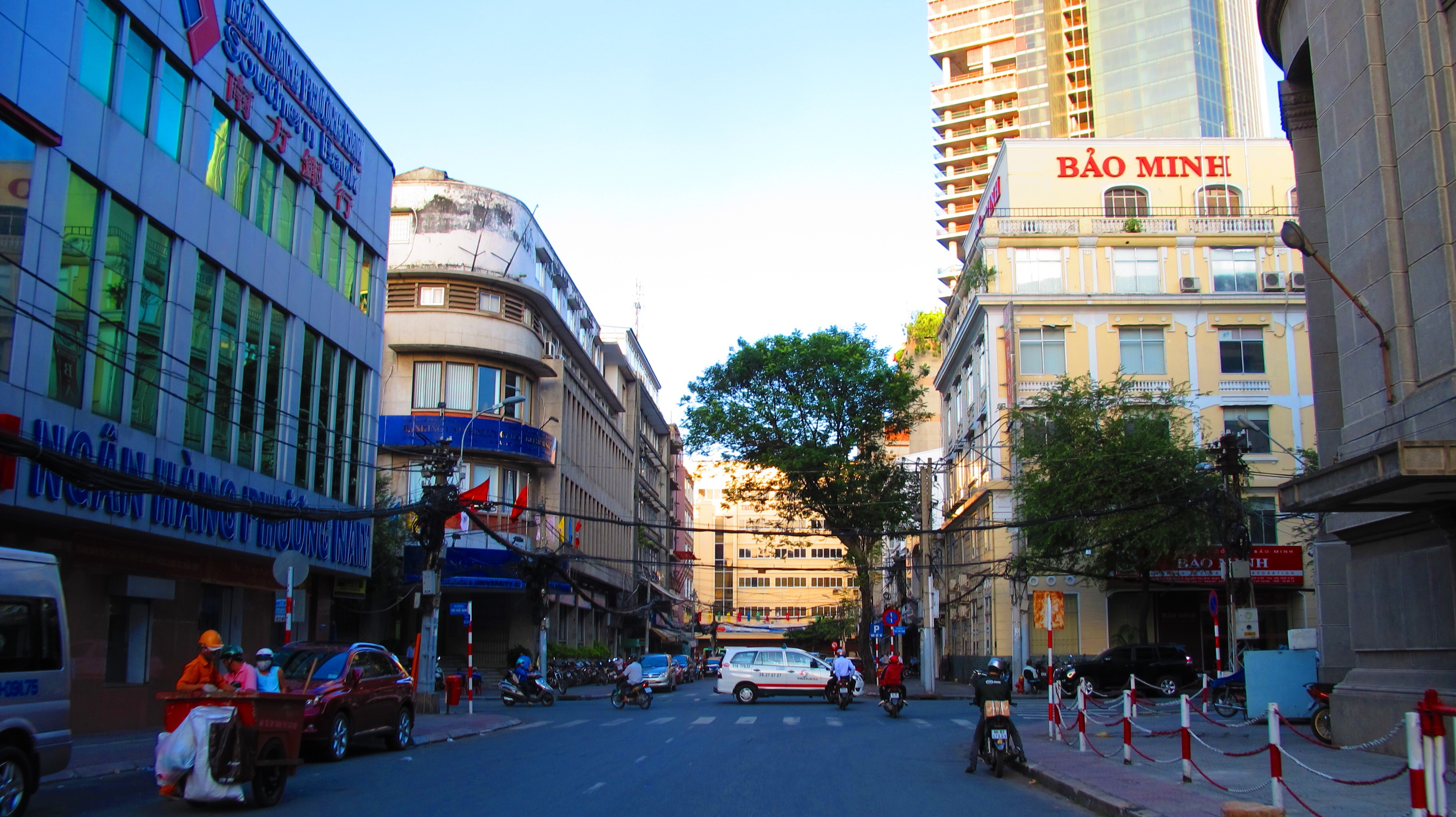
HUB main campus on the corner of Tôn Thất Đạm – Nguyễn Công Trứ

== History ==
The predecessor of this banking university was a banking school founded in 1976 in Ho Chi Minh City after the Fall of Saigon. In 1998, this school was incorporated into Banking Institute (Vietnam) with the headquarters campus in Hanoi and became a branch of Banking Institute in Ho Chi Minh City. On 19 January 2004, Vietnamese prime minister Phan Văn Khải signed a Decision to establish Banking University of Ho Chi Minh City on the basis of this branch. On January 19, 2004, this university was assigned to provide education of doctoral degree and master's degree.

The university has cooperation with University of Bolton (UK) and Asian Institute of Technology in education.

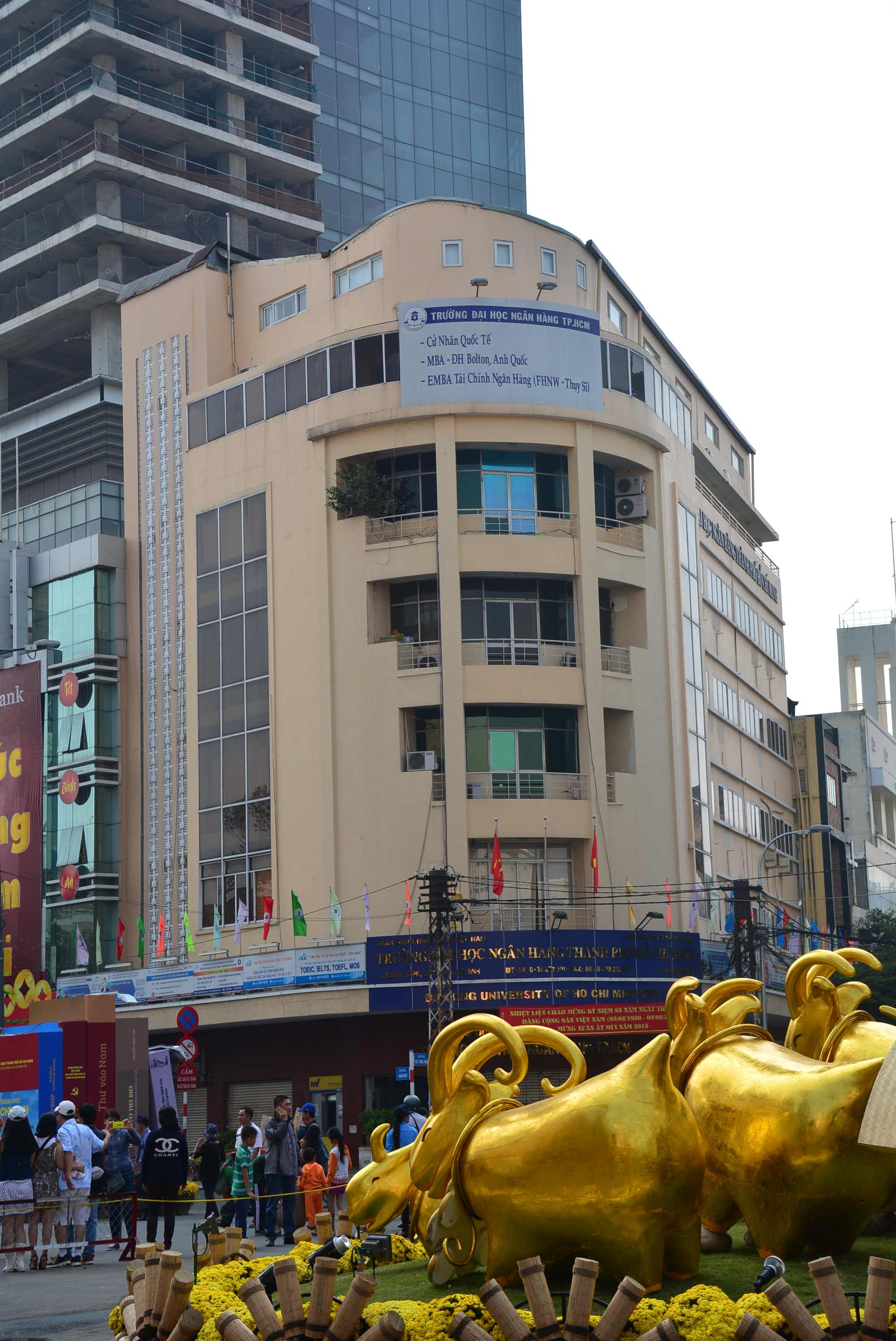
Saigon International School of Business (ISB) of HUB at Campus 39 Hàm Nghi. This is the former place of the first U.S. Embassy in Saigon
