= Bách Tùng Diệp Park =

Park in the center of Ho Chi Minh City, Vietnam

- Liên Hiệp Park
- Công viên Bách Tùng Diệp
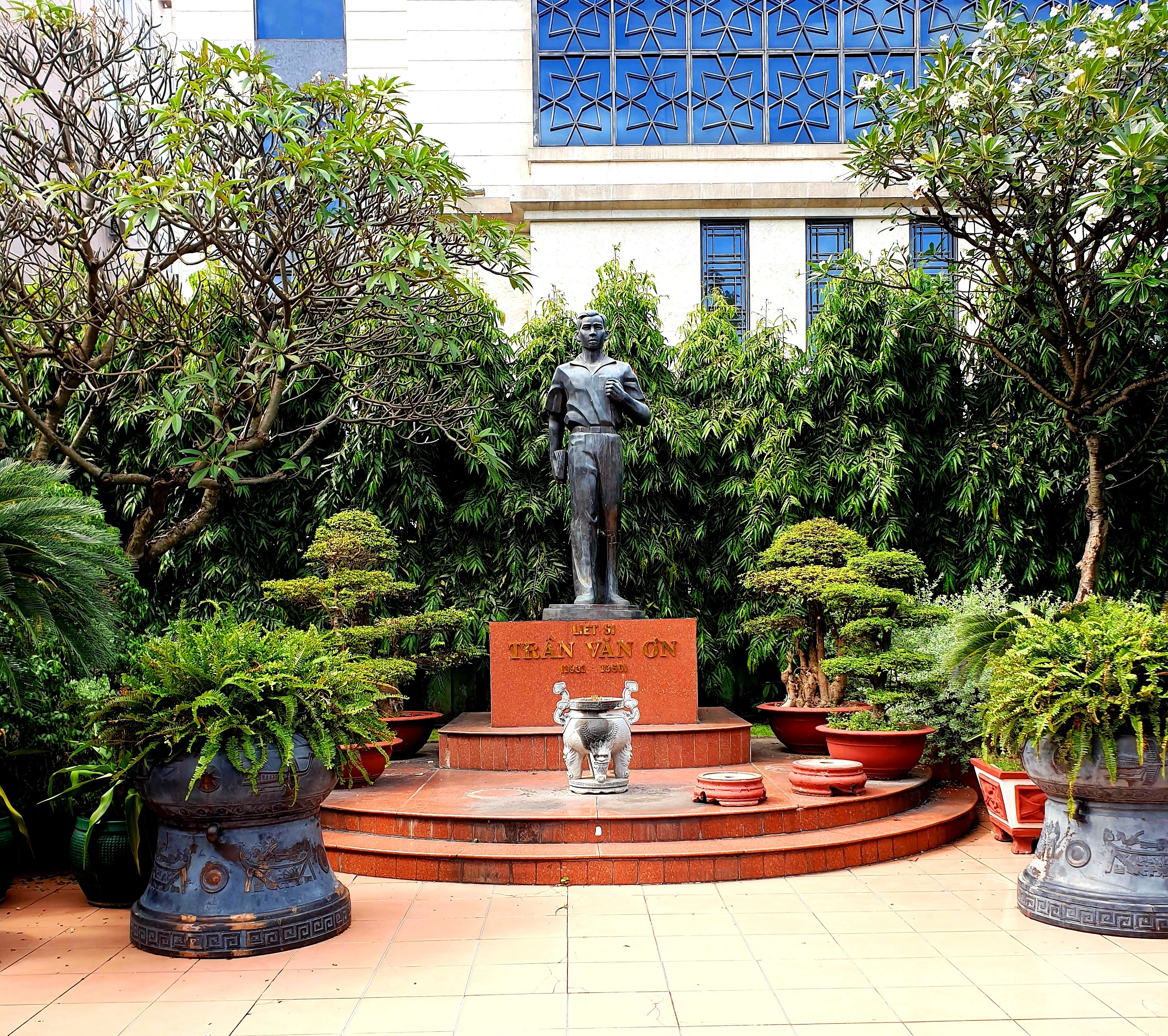
- Tran Van On Statue in the park (2021)
- Interactive map of Bách Tùng Diệp Park
- Location: District 1, Ho Chi Minh City (Saigon)
- Coordinates: 10°46′34″N 106°41′57″E
- Area: 5,000 square metres (1.2 acres)
- Open: 1928
- Status: Open all year
- Public transit: L1 Opers House station

Bách Tùng Diệp Park (Vietnamese: Công viên Bách Tùng Diệp, formerly known as Liên Hiệp Park during the time of the Republic of Vietnam) is a park situated in the heart of Ho Chi Minh City (Saigon), Vietnam, within District 1. It is surrounded by streets of Lý Tự Trọng, Nam Kỳ Khởi Nghĩa, and Pasteur. It is opposite the City Museum and covering an area of approximately 5,000 square metres (1.2 acres),

== Functionality ==
Previously, this area has only housed the statue of Tran Van On, a student at Pétrus Ký School who was fatally shot by the French authorities during the student protests in Saigon in early 1950. However, following the demolition of Quách Thị Trang Square in front of Ben Thanh Market for the construction of an underground station on Ho Chi Minh City Metro Line 1, the statue of Quach Thi Trang was relocated here. Within the park stands a centuries-old banyan tree with five trunks, estimated to be over 300 years old as of the early 2000s. According to Pétrus Ký, in this area during the reign of King Tu Duc, there was a bustling market called Cây Da Còm, which was frequented by students purchasing clothes and hats before taking Confucian court examinations.

Around 2006, there was a proposal to build a five-story underground parking lot beneath the park, consisting of three levels for parking and two levels for commercial purposes. However, by early 2017, this plan was scrapped as it no longer aligned with urban planning. Towards the end of 2017, the park became a pilot location for the local government's "street vendor" initiative, providing free spaces for impoverished households in District 1 to conduct business under the regulations.

== History ==
In historical retrospect, France and Spain once allied to attack the Nguyen Dynasty, beginning in Danang in 1858. After seizing Gia Dinh Province, France handed over the land that now belongs to the park to Spain in 1864, with a smaller area of 3,000 square metres (0.74 acres) for the construction of a consulate. However, Spanish representatives gradually withdrew from Saigon, leaving this land vacant for over half a century. The colonial authorities carefully tended to the land, transforming it into a garden, thus giving rise to the name Jardin d’Espagne (literally "Spanish Garden"). In 1927, the Spanish transferred the land to the British for the construction of a British consulate. Recognizing the impracticality of building the consulate at this location, Britain officially exchanged it for another plot on Norodom Boulevard (now Lê Duẩn Boulevard) in 1928, where the British Consulate General remains to this day. In 1955, the South Vietnamese government renamed Jardin d’Espagne to Liên Hiệp Park. In the early 1980s, the houses adjacent to the park were demolished to expand it, as it remains today.
