= Ben Thanh station =

Metro station in Ho Chi Minh City, Vietnam

Coordinates: 10°46′15″N 106°41′52″E

L1 01 L2 01 Ben Thanh Bến Thành
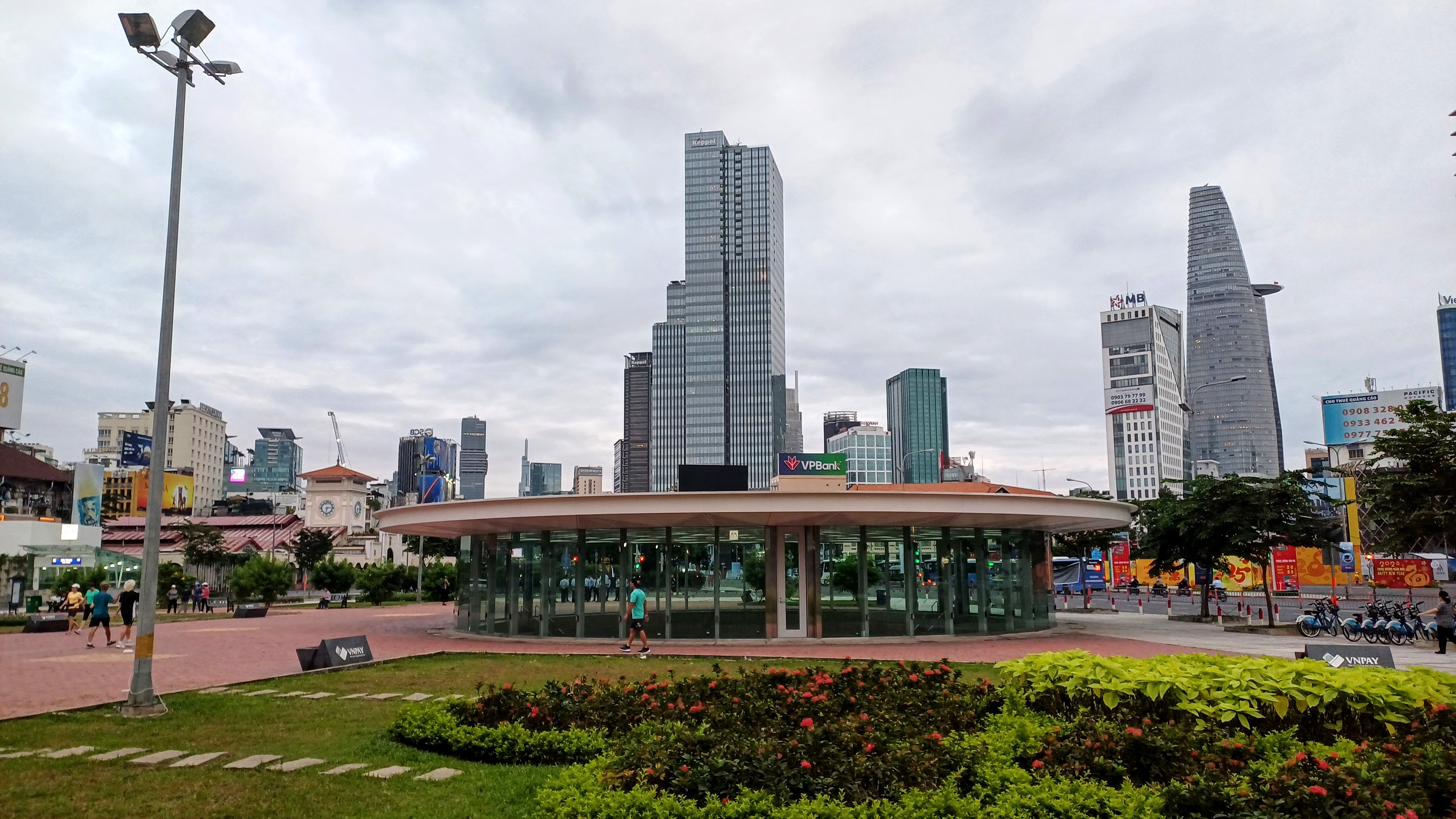
- The main entrance and skylight of the station at September 23 Park look towards to Quách Thị Trang Square

General information
- Location: Quách Thị Trang Square, Bến Thành, Ho Chi Minh City, Vietnam
- System: Ho Chi Minh City Metro station
- Line: L1 L2 L4 L12
- Bus routes: 1, 3, 4, 13, 18, 19, 20, 28, 31, 34, 36, 38, 39, 44, 45, 52, 53, 56, 65, 69, 75, 86, 88, 93, 102, 109, 152, 155, 156, D4, 61-6

Construction
- Structure type: Underground

Other information
- Status: Completed
- Station code: L1-01

History
- Opened: 22 December 2024
Services
Preceding station	Ho Chi Minh City Metro	Following station
Terminus	Line 1	Opera House L1 02 towards Suoi Tien Terminal
Terminus	Line 2 Phase 1 - Opening 2030-2032	Tao Đàn L2 02 towards Tân Bình
Turtle Lake L4 13 towards Thạnh Xuân	Line 4 Proposed	Hoàng Diệu L4 15 towards Hiệp Phước Port
Route map
Line 1
Line 2
Location

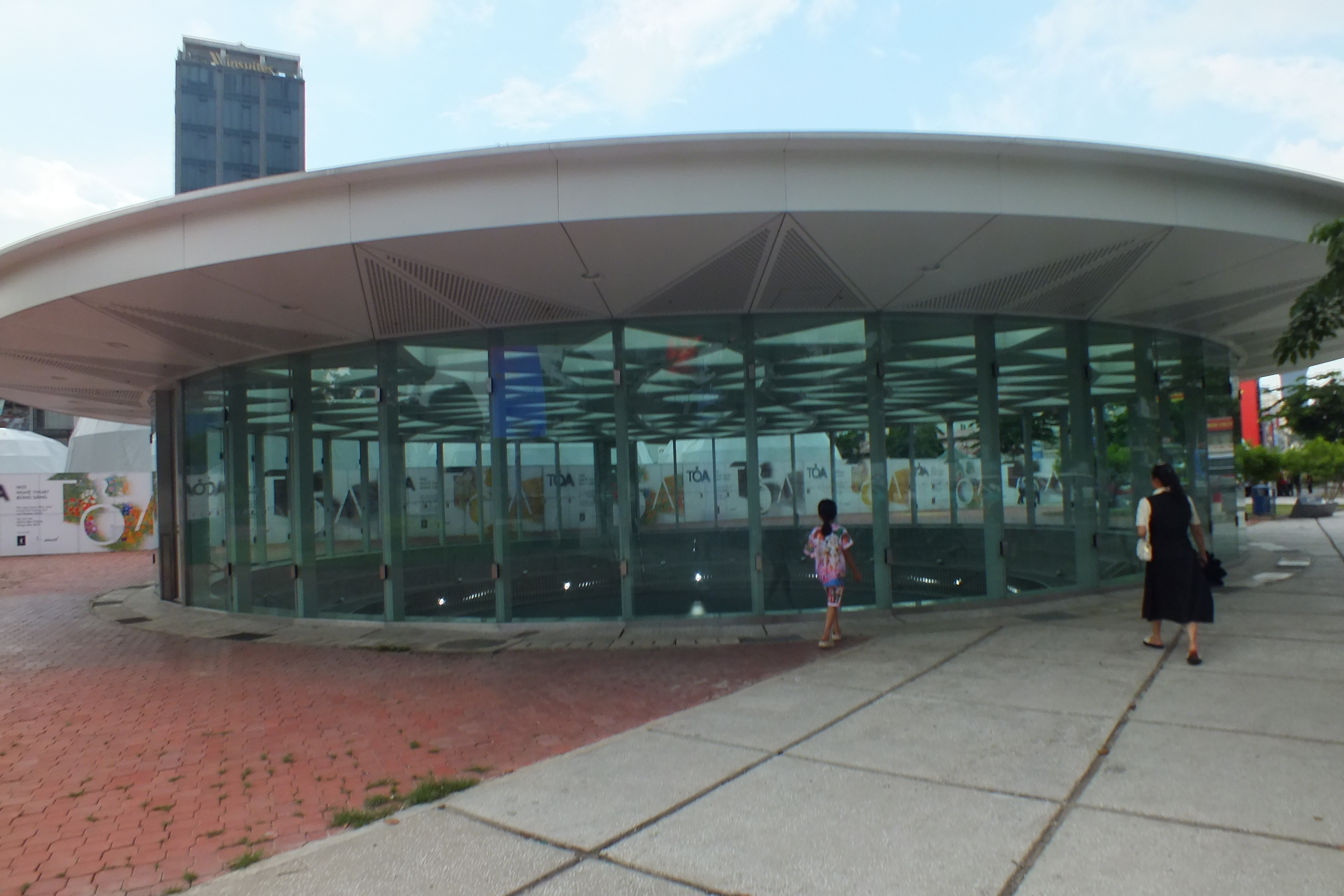
Station skylight above ground

Ben Thanh station (Vietnamese: Ga Bến Thành) is an underground Ho Chi Minh City Metro interchange station on the Line 1 and the future Line 2, 4 and 12. Located under the Lê Lợi Boulevard, September 23rd Park and Quách Thị Trang Square, in front of Bến Thành Market, the station serves as the central metro station in Ho Chi Minh City, Vietnam. The station opened on 22 December 2024.

== Development ==
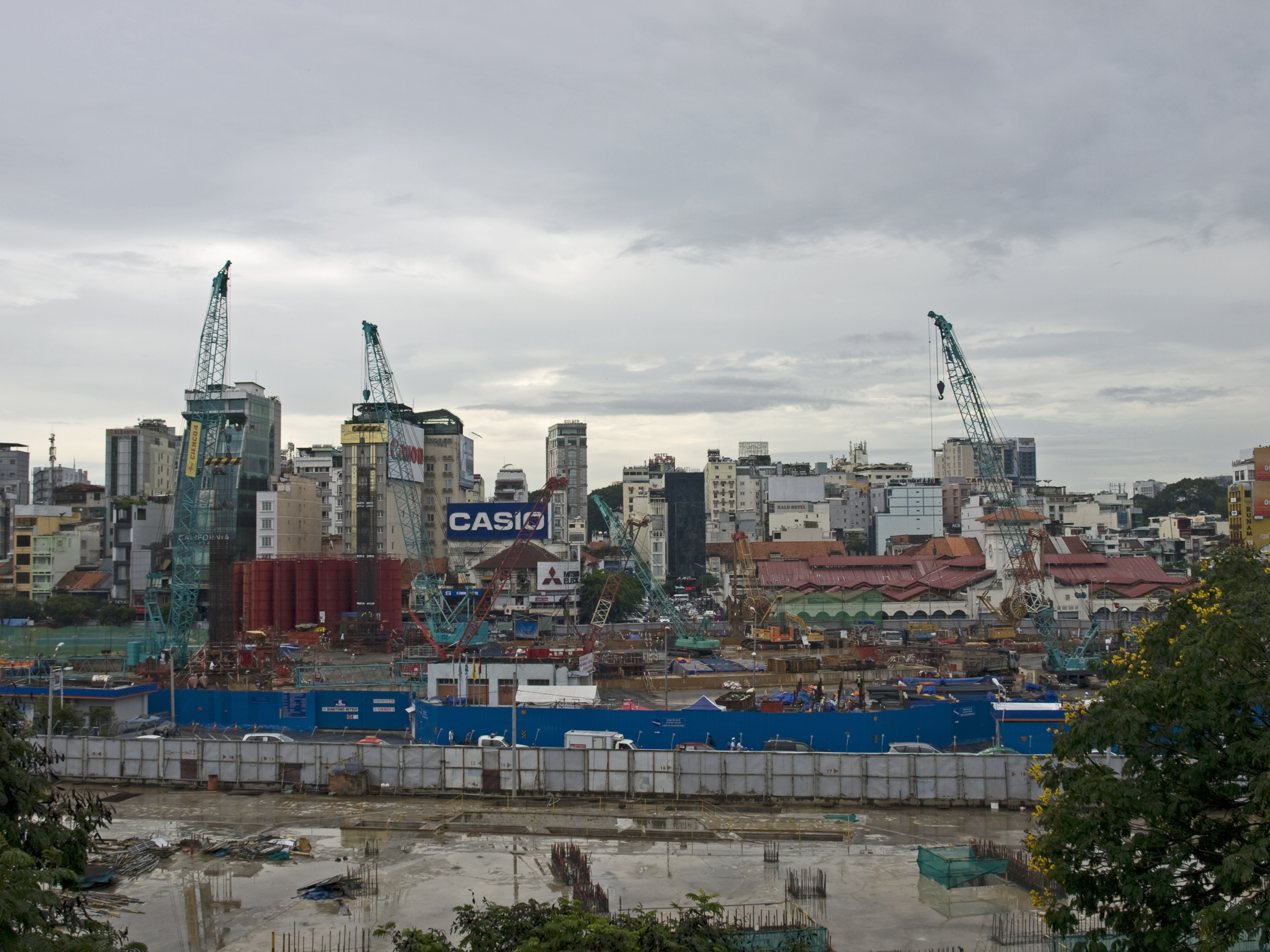
Bến Thành station under construction in 2017

Officially inaugurated in late 2012 and opened in late 2024 along with the Ho Chi Minh City Metro Line 1. Bến Thành station is designed as an "underground quarter" stretching 515m to the Opera House station along the Lê Lợi Boulevard down to the ground about 21m.

The station has a total of 4 underground floors with a ground floor:

- Ground Floor: includes 6 entrance gates (entrance 4 and 5 are located in the One Central Saigon) and the square area.
- 1st Floor: is the underground area leading to the Opera House station and is divided into 4 areas: commercial area, sales area, technical department area, entrance gate area and control gate.
- 2nd Floor: train reception area for Line 1, divided into 2 areas: train reception area and technical department area.
- 3rd Floor: train transfer area including: train pick-up area of Line 4 with technical department area.
- 4th floor: train pick-up area of Line 2.

In addition to the function of connecting traffic between metro lines, this station also has a commercial service system - the construction investment cost is 6,865 billion VND.

== Station layout ==
=== For Line 1, 2 and 4 ===
GF
Ground Floor
Entrances/Exits
B1F
1st Floor
Ticket sales area, commercial area, technical department area, platform gates & ticket gates
B2F
2nd Floor
Technical department area
Platform
Platform 1
L1 Line 1 to Opera House (for Suoi Tien Terminal) →

← L1 Line 1 to Thái Bình Market (for An Hạ)

Island platform, doors will open on the left/right side
Platform 2
L1 Line 1 to Opera House (for Suoi Tien Terminal) →
B3F
3rd Floor
Technical department area
Platform
Platform 3
← L4 Line 4 to Hoàng Diệu (for Hiệp Phước Urban Area) (planned)
Island platform, doors will open on the right side
Platform 4
L4 Line 4 to Turtle Lake (for Đông Thạnh) (planned) Transfer to L3 Line 3 on the next station →
B4F
Platform
Platform 5
← L2 Line 2 to Tao Đàn (for Tân Bình) (phase 1, under construction) Transfer to L3 Line 3 on the next station
Island platform, doors will open on the left/right side
Platform 6
← L2 Line 2 to Tao Đàn (for Tân Bình) (phase 1, under construction) Transfer to L3 Line 3 on the next station
L2 Line 2 to Hàm Nghi (for Thủ Thiêm) (phase 2, planned) →

=== For Line 12 ===
G
Ground Floor
Entrances/Exits
B1F
1st Floor
Ticket sales area, commercial area, technical department area, platform gates & ticket gates
B2F

Platofrm

Platform 7
L12 Line 12 to Tân Thuận (for Cần Giờ) (planned) →
Island platform, doors will open on the left/right side
Platform 8
L12 Line 12 to Tân Thuận (for Cần Giờ) (planned) →

== Surrounding area ==
The station located at Quách Thị Trang Square, the top most busiest intersection of the city, it is surrounded by:

- Bến Thành Market (next to Gate 3 at West Gate, East Gate opposite Entrance/Exit 6)
- Trường Thạnh Buddhist Temple
- Mariamman Hindu Temple (Chùa Bà Ấn Độ)
- Nguyễn An Ninh Street – Saigon Halal Street
- Lê Công Kiều Street – Antique District
- Saigon General Hospital (at Gate 6)
- Saigon Railway Transport JSC Headquarter (Tòa nhà Hỏa Xa) (at Gate 6)
- Ho Chi Minh City Stock Exchange
- Ho Chi Minh City Museum of Fine Arts
- September 23rd Park (at Gate 1 & 2)
- Tao Đàn Park
- General Sciences Library of Ho Chi Minh City
- Conservatory of Ho Chi Minh City
- Cao Thắng Technical College
- Ernst Thälmann High School
- Nguyễn Thái Học Primary School
- Liberty Central Saigon Centre Hotel
- New World Saigon Hotel (near Gate 2)
- A&B Tower (near Gate 2)
- One Central Saigon (directly connected to Gate 4 & 5, under construction)
- Saigon Centre
- SJC Tower (on hold; previously was place of the ITC building that was deconstructed in 2002 by fire)
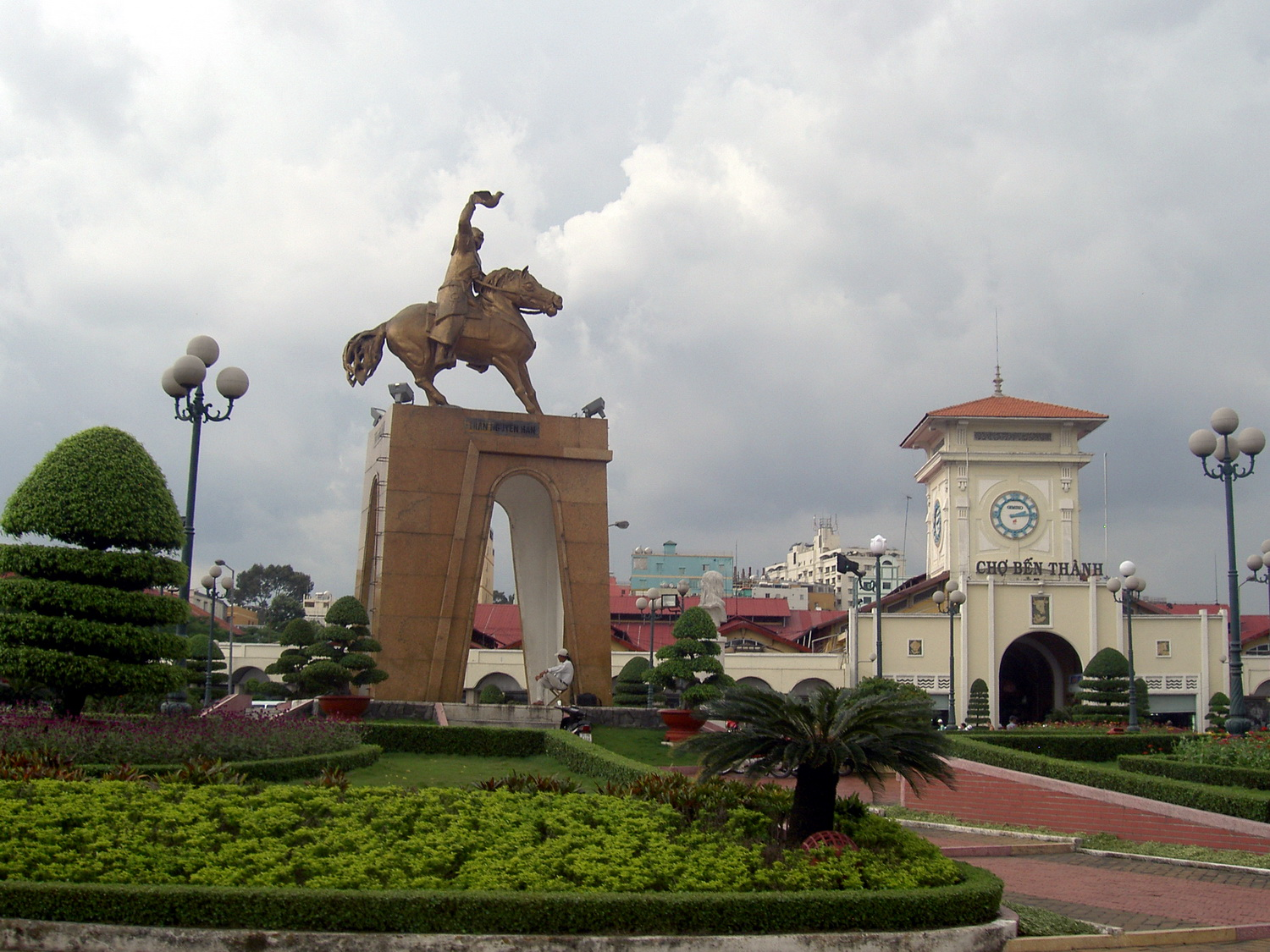
Quách Thị Trang Square before 2017 with the statue of Trần Nguyên Hãn and Bến Thành Market, where the station is underneath

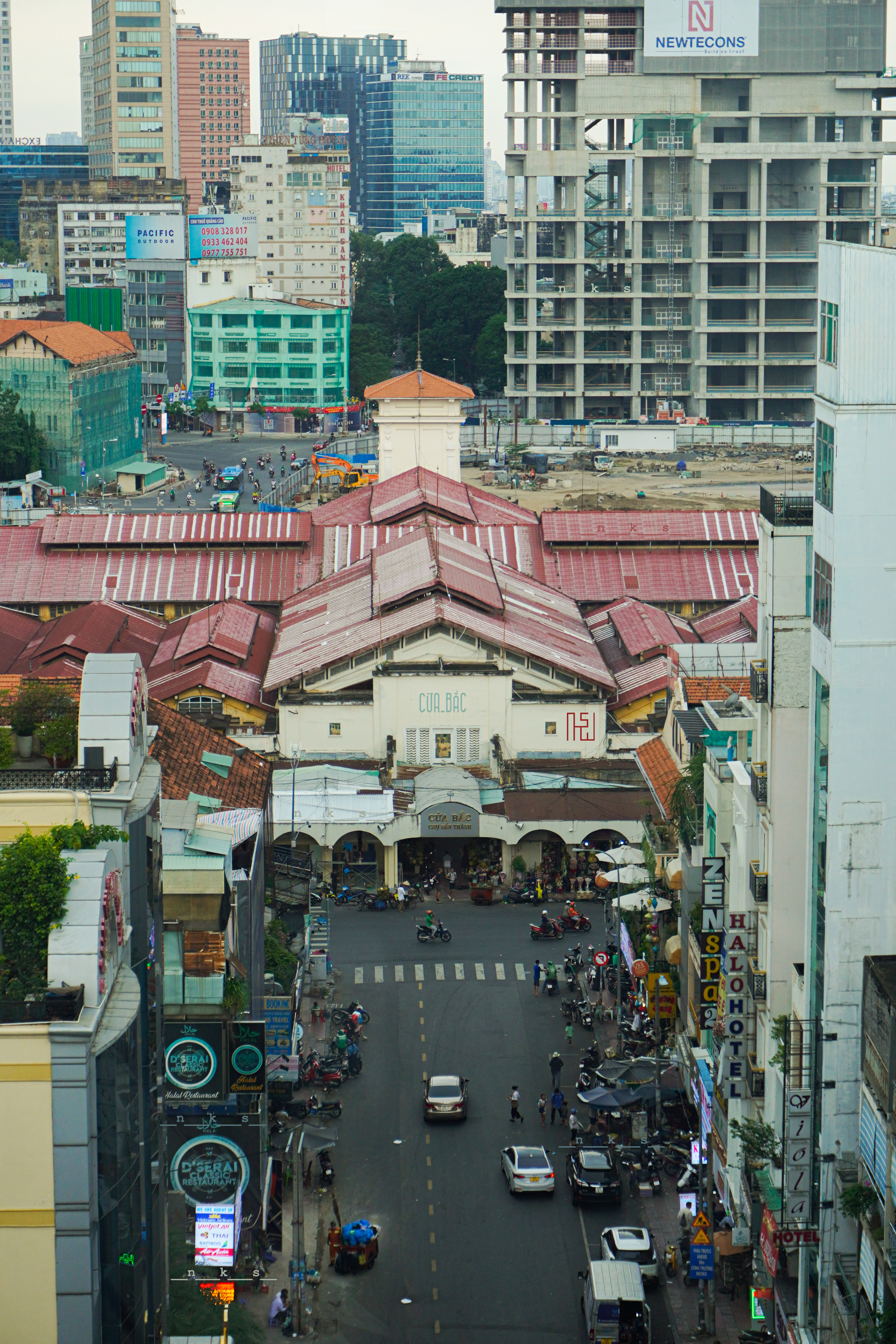
Bến Thành Station under construction at Quách Thị Trang Square, seen from Nesta Hotel Saigon on Thủ Khoa Huân Street

The city government planned to renovate the Quách Thị Trang Square, an area around the station, become a pedestrian crossing that is inspired by Times Square in New York City or Shibuya Crossing inTokyo, etc. Both the statues of Trần Nguyên Hãn and Quách Thị Trang also will be returned to the square after being stored for years in Phú Lâm Park in District 6 (Chợ Lớn) and Bách Tùng Diệp Park in District 1, respectively.

== See also ==
- Quách Thị Trang Square
- September 23rd Park
- Suoi Tien Terminal station (Line 1)
- Opera House station (Line 1)
- Tao Đàn station (Line 2, 3)
- Hàm Nghi Station (Line 2)
