= Quách Thị Trang Square =

City square in Ho Chi Minh City, Vietnam

- City square
- Công trường Quách Thị Trang
- Former names: Place Eugène Cuniac, Diên Hồng Square
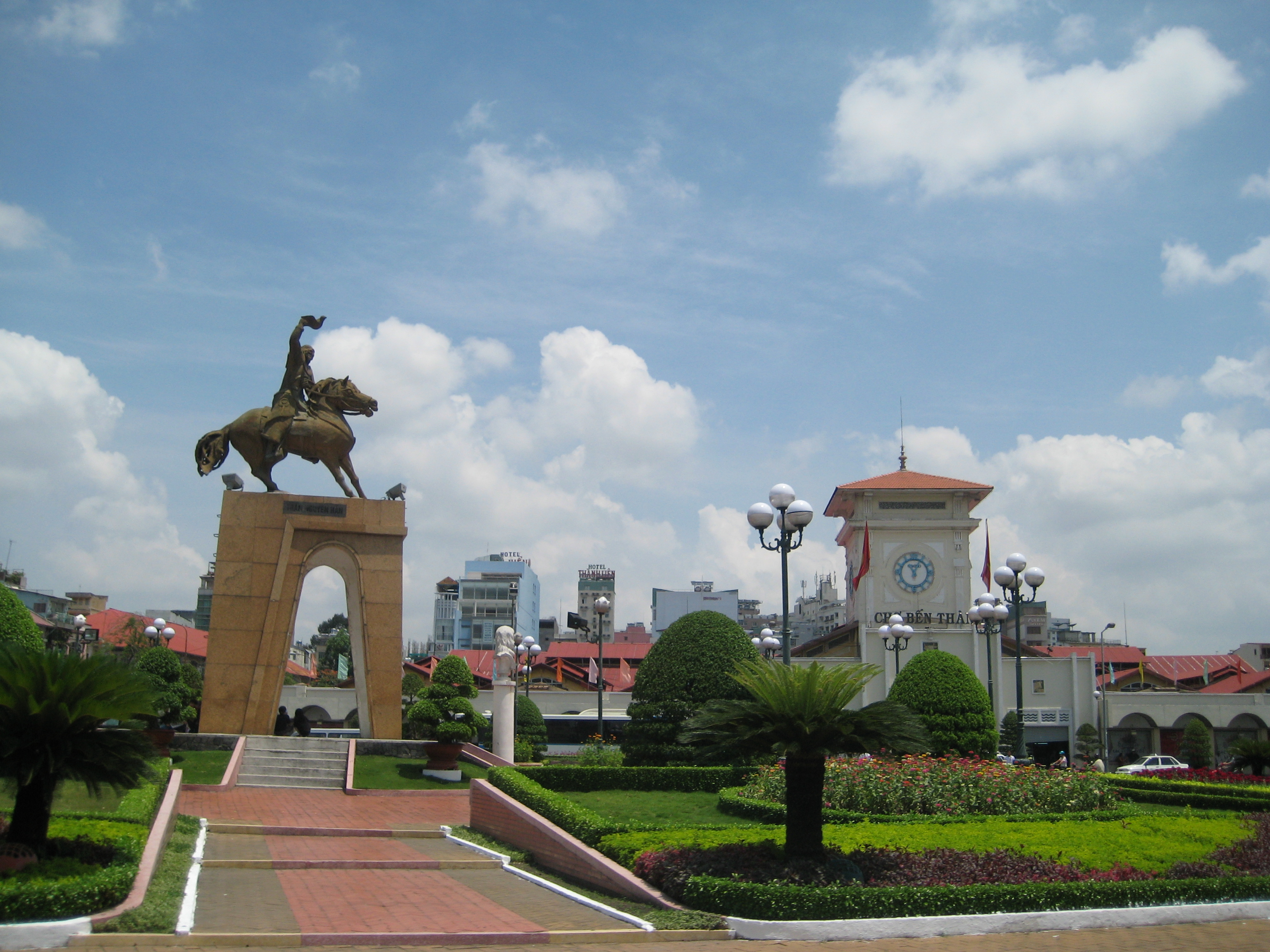
- Quach Thi Trang Square in 2009
- Owner: Ho Chi Minh City (Saigon)
- Location: District 1, Ho Chi Minh City
- Interactive map of Quách Thị Trang Square
- Coordinates: 10°46′17″N 106°41′54″E

Quách Thị Trang Square (Vietnamese: Công trường Quách Thị Trang) is the city square in front of the well-known Bến Thành Market in District 1, downtown Ho Chi Minh City (Saigon), Vietnam.

It is formed by the junction of some major throughfare, including Trần Hưng Đạo Boulevard, Hàm Nghi Boulevard, Lê Lợi Boulevard, Lê Lai Street, Phạm Ngũ Lão Street (the two latters are run along the September 23rd Park) with some other nearby minor streets of Phó Đức Chính, Huỳnh Thúc Kháng, Phan Bội Châu and Phan Chu Trinh (the two latters are run along the East and West gate of Bến Thành Market, respectively).

The square was known for its landscaped traffic circle featuring the equestrian statue of Trần Nguyên Hãn and the white bust of Quách Thị Trang. For six years from 2017 to 2022, it was the construction site of the Ben Thanh station, the central station of the Ho Chi Minh City Metro.

== History ==
For two decades following the French conquest of Saigon, the site that would become the present-day Quách Thị Trang was part of a large marsh known as Marais Boresse. In the early 1880s, part of the marsh was reclaimed for the construction of the Saigon–My Tho railway line and a large steam locomotive depot. However, the present-day square was not laid out until 1910, when the government approved a 1.25-million-piastre project for sanitation of the Boresse marsh which also included the planning of the new railway station and the construction of the Saigon–Cholon boulevard (modern-day Trần Hưng Đạo). As a result, the locomotive depot was demolished and the railway terminus was relocated to the area now occupied by September 23rd Park.

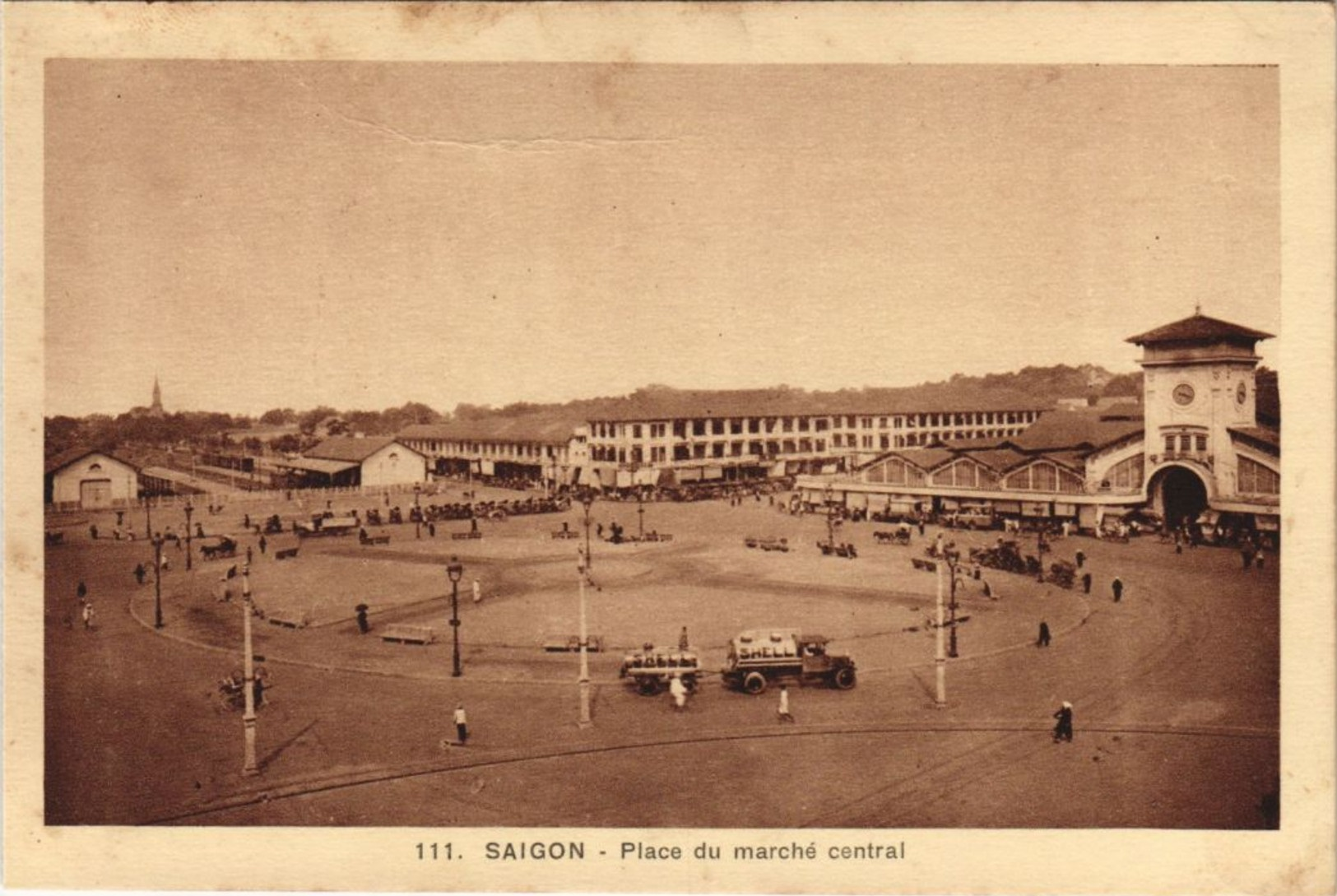
The Eugène Cuniac Square

The square, originally a simple open space, was opened in March 1914, along with the Halles centrales (present-day Bến Thành Market). In 1916, it was officially named place Eugène Cuniac, in honour of the former Mayor of Saigon Eugène François Jean-Baptiste Cuniac (1851–1916), although still commonly known as the place du marché central (Central market Square). The subsequent openings of the new Saigon Railway Station (1915) and the Halles centrales electric tramway terminus (1923) and the operation of two bus stations transformed the square into one of Saigon's most important transport hubs. In 1929, the authorities installed a traffic circle with landscaped gardens at the square's center.

In 1955, place Eugène Cuniac was renamed Diên Hồng Square (Công trường Diên Hồng) by the South Vietnamese government after the name of a meeting convened by emperor Trần Thánh Tông to solicit a referendum in the face of the second Mongol invasion of Đại Việt.

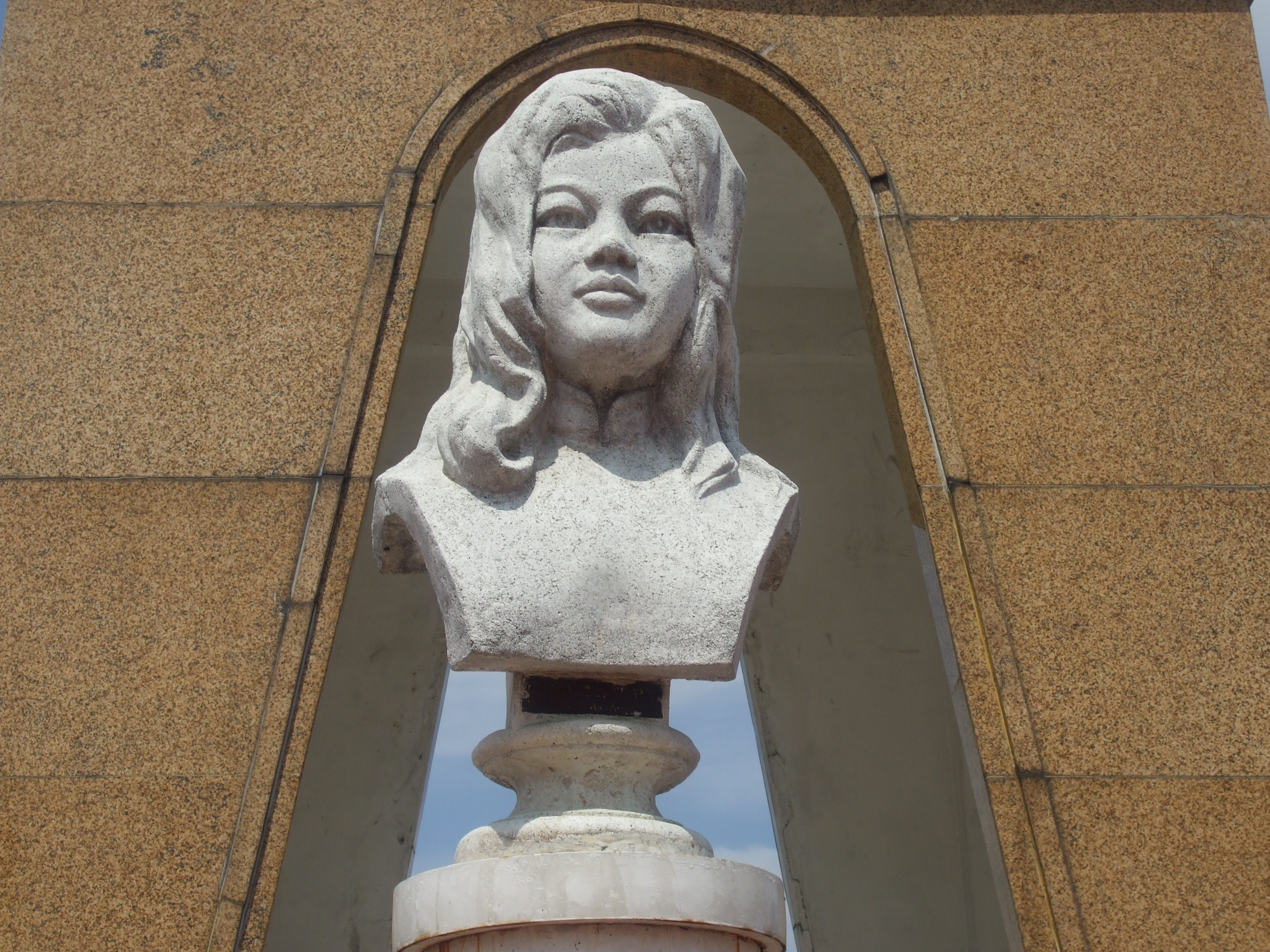
Memorial bust of Quách Thị Trang in 2008

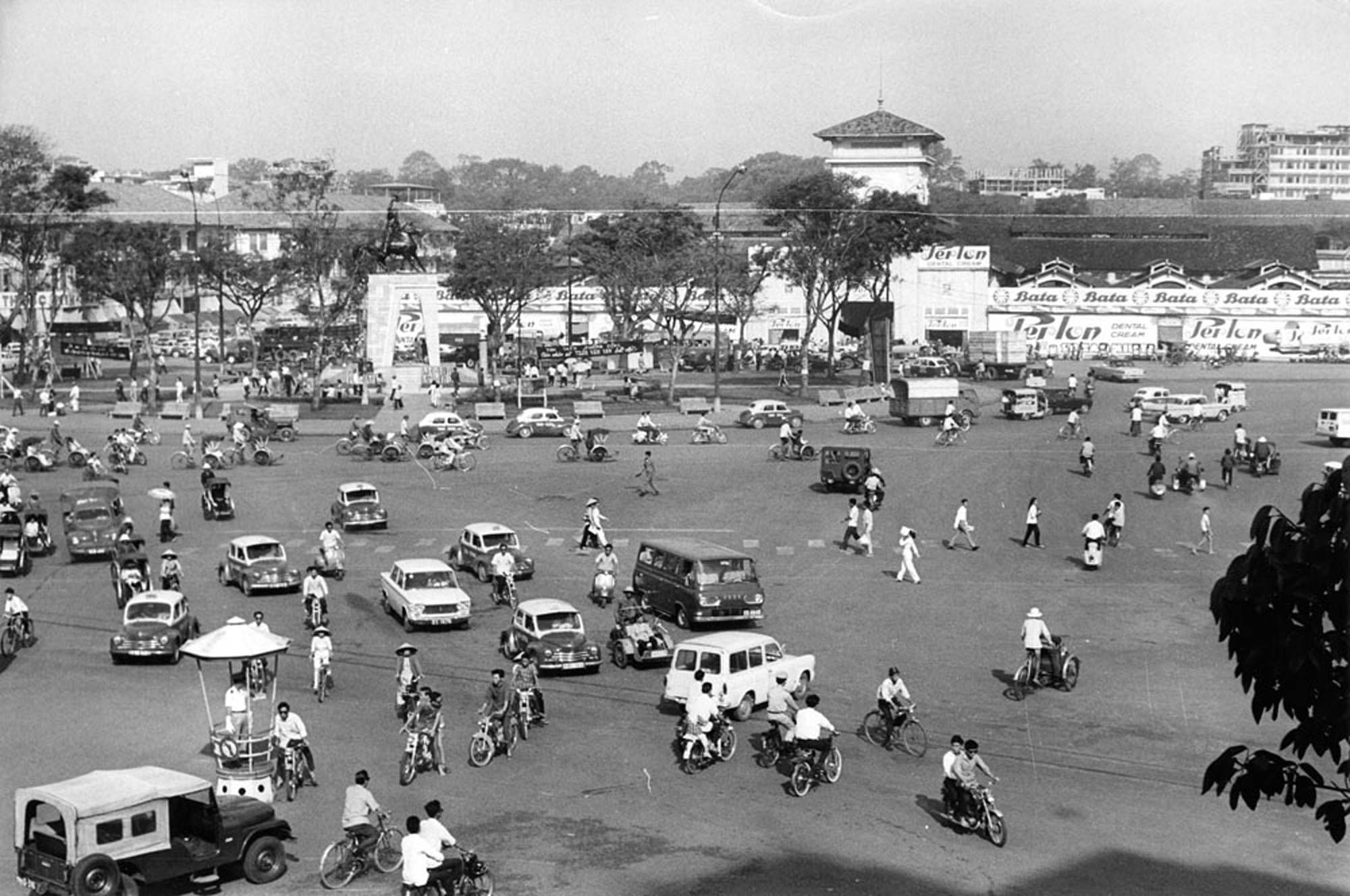
Dien Hong Square in 1967

On 25 August 1963 (during the Buddhist crisis), Quách Thị Trang, a 15-year-old Buddhist and student, was shot dead by a stray bullet at Diên Hồng Square while protesting against the martial law imposed by Ngô Đình Diệm. A year later, a white memorial bust of Quách Thị Trang was placed near the center of the roundabout. According to Vu Quang Hung, who was then a student and the head of the secret "Quach Thi Trang Monument Construction Committee", the erection of the bust was carefully planned to take place very quickly in late September 1964 during a protest against the Vũng Tàu Charter proclaimed by General Nguyễn Khánh, when the crowd surrounded the site and concealed the monument construction. In 1966, an equestrian statue of Trần Nguyên Hãn, a 15th-century general who fought in the Lam Sơn uprising, was also erected in the center of the roundabout.

After Vietnam was reunified, Diên Hồng Square was officially renamed Quách Thị Trang Square. The statues of Trần Nguyên Hãn and Quách Thị Trang remained in place until 2014, when the former was moved to Phú Lâm Park in District 6, and the latter was moved to Bách Tùng Diệp Park.

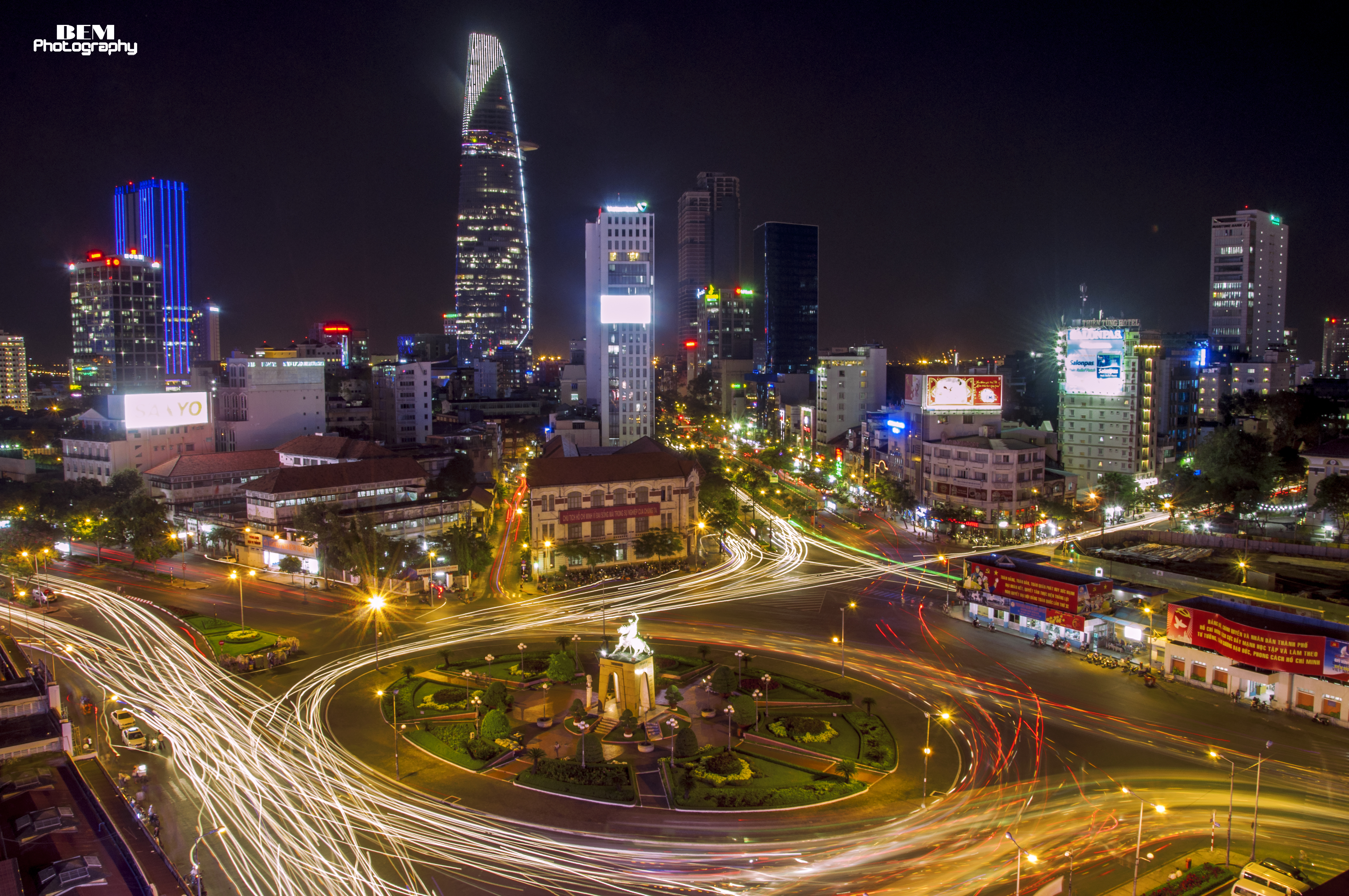
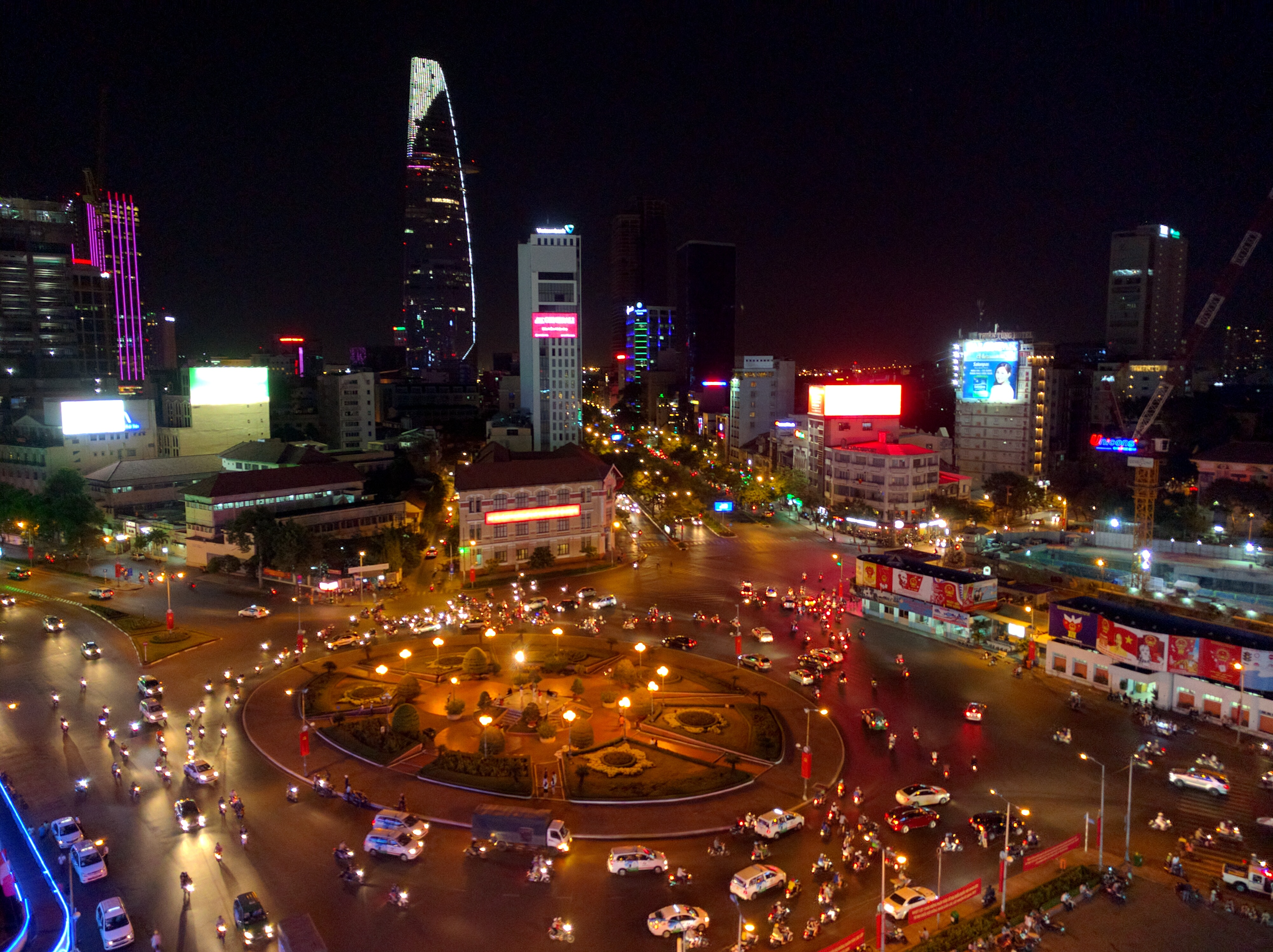
View of the square before and after the removal of the Tran Nguyen Han statue and the Quach Thi Trang bust

Additionally, in 1957, the tramway terminus at the square, previously managed by the Compagnie française des tramways de l'Indochine (C.F.T.I.), was taken over by the Republic of Vietnam Ministry of Public Works and Transport and became the central bus station of Saigon. This bus station remained in operation until 2017 when it was relocated to the nearby Hàm Nghi Boulevard to make space for the metro station construction site. The Saigon Railway Station, on the other hand, was soon closed in 1978 and was relocated to Hòa Hưng (the site of the current station), while the area of the old station was converted into the present-day September 23 Park.

Upon the completion of the metro station, the square was temporarily restored and traffic was rerouted to create a pedestrian zone in front of Bến Thành Market. A further major renovation of the square, which includes the reelection of the two monuments, is expected to be completed in 2025.

== In popular media ==
Quách Thị Trang Square Roundabout along with Bến Thành Market were appeared in the music video of "Stronger (What Doesn't Kill You)" by Kelly Clarkson as one of the flash mob videos alternate throughout the video. The video was taken by Youth to Change (YTC), a youth network of the non-profit organization ActionAid International Vietnam, at the September 23rd Park, towards Lê Lợi Boulevard, it was an idea of a member from the forum after Clarkson announced on her website that she wanted to incorporate a global flash mob into the accompanying music video to express more "the spirit of the song and the country".

== See also ==
- Bến Thành Market
- Lê Lợi Boulevard
- Hàm Nghi Boulevard
- Ben Thanh station
