= Line 12 (Ho Chi Minh City Metro) =

Under construction high-speed rail line in Ho Chi Minh City, Vietnam

- L12

Overview
- Native name: Tuyến 12
- Status: Under construction
- Owner: VinSpeed
- Locale: Ho Chi Minh City, Vietnam
- Termini: Ben Thanh; Cần Giờ
- Stations: 2 (Phase 1); 6 (Phase 2)

Service
- Type: High-speed rail
- System: Ho Chi Minh City Metro
- Operator: VinSpeed
- Depot(s): Nhà Bè, Cần Giờ
- Rolling stock: Siemens Velaro Novo, 8 cars per train set

History
- Planned opening: 2028

Technical
- Line length: 53.8 kilometers (33.4 mi)
- Number of tracks: 2
- Track gauge: 1,435 mm (4 ft 8 1/2 in) standard gauge
- Electrification: 25 kV 50 Hz AC from overhead catenary
- Operating speed: 159 km/h (99 mph); 350 km/h (220 mph) (maximum)

Line 12 of the Ho Chi Minh City Metro (Vietnamese: Tuyến số 12 của hệ thống đường sắt đô thị Thành phố Hồ Chí Minh) is an under construction high-speed rail line in Ho Chi Minh City, Vietnam. It will connect Ben Thanh station with the commune of Cần Giờ.

== History ==
The line is planned to be built by VinSpeed, a subsidiary of Vingroup, with the first stage expected for completion in 2028. In December 2025, the Ho Chi Minh City municipal People's Committee approved the construction of the line. A total of 102.43 trillion Vietnamese Dong was allocated for the project. The groundbreaking ceremony took place on 19 December 2025.

== Stations ==
The 54 kilometres (34 mi) line will begin at Ben Thanh station and terminate at Can Gio station. Phase 1 will complete the line between Ben Thanh and Cần Giờ stations. Phase 2 will have more potential stations and depots on the line at Tân Thuận (also depot), Tân Mỹ, Nhà Bè (also depot), and Bình Khánh.
