= Bến Nghé =

Historic toponym and central area in Ho Chi Minh City, Vietnam

Bến Nghé Trung tâm Thành phố Hồ Chí Minh Bingeh
- City centre and Central business district
- Ho Chi Minh City Center
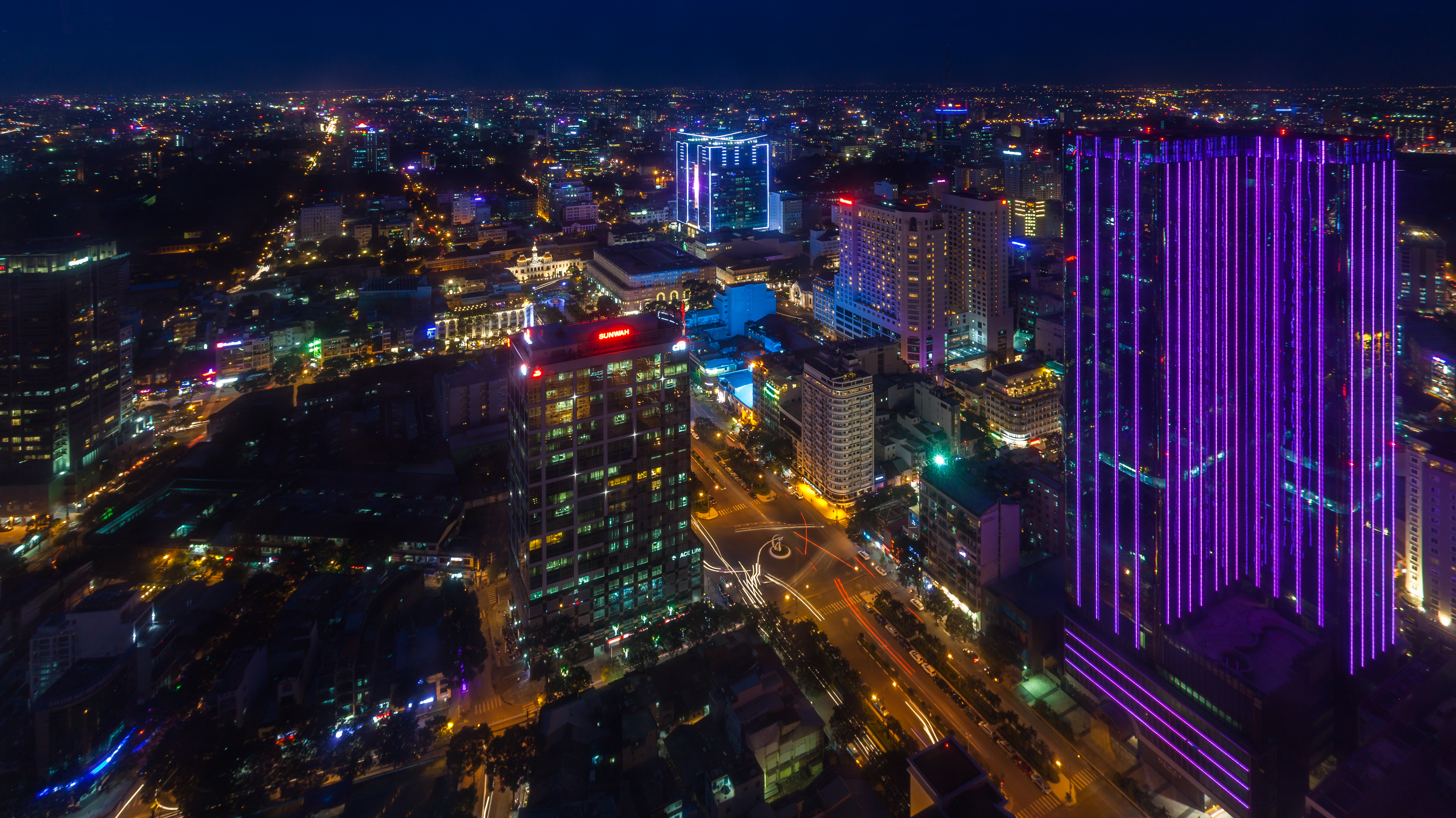
- Ho Chi Minh City Center seen from Saigon Skydeck at night in 2013
- Nickname(s): Downtown Saigon, Existing central area, 930 ha central area
- Interactive map of Bến Nghé
- Coordinates: 10.7822°N 106.7028°E
- Country: Vietnam
- City: Ho Chi Minh City
- Ward: Bến Thành, Đa Kao, Khánh Hội, Saigon, Thạnh Mỹ Tây, Xóm Chiếu, Xuân Hòa

Area
  - Total: 9.3 km^{2} (3.6 sq mi)

Population (2013)
  - Estimate (2013): 248,193

Bến Nghé is a place name in Ho Chi Minh City, Vietnam. This area was originally a port town, until the French invaded and developed it into Ville de Saigon, which corresponds to what is now the existing central area of the city. In modern time, it was known as a former ward of District 1, which is today major part of Saigon ward, Ho Chi Minh City.

== Etymology ==
There are currently two different hypotheses regarding the origin of Bến Nghé. The first hypothesis suggests that the name is derived from the Khmer language term "Kompong Krabei", where kompong means a landing or wharf (also means "Bến" in Vietnamese), and krabei refers to a buffalo or calf ("Nghé" in Vietnamese). The second hypothesis posits that the river landing here was once home to many crocodiles, whose sounded like those of a young buffalo, leading to the name; coincidentally, what is now Hàm Nghi Boulevard in this area was the former rạch Cầu Sấu (translating to "Crocodile Bridge Creek") as it is believed that this name originated from crocodile farms established along the canal banks in the 19th century to raise the animals for their meat.

== History ==
=== Tax collextion station ===
In 1623, with the approval of the King of Cambodia Chey Chettha II, Lord Nguyễn Phúc Nguyên authorized the establishment of two tax collection stations at Kas Krobei (Bến Nghé) and Prei Nokor (Sài Gòn (Note: The Sài Gòn area was later resettled as Chợ Lớn by the French.)) to collect taxes from the Vietnamese migrants in the region. In 1679, Lord Nguyễn Phúc Tần established a military outpost in Tân Mỹ village, located near what is now the intersection of Nguyễn Trãi and Cống Quỳnh streets. These developments encouraged the Vietnamese people of the Đàng Trong realm to settle in the area, where they cultivated the land, established their lives, and engaged in economic activities.

=== First official establishment ===
In 1698, Commander Nguyễn Hữu Cảnh to assume the role of imperial commissioner (or regional viceroy) Đồng Nai – Gia Định, noted that the territory had been expanded by thousands of miles, and the population had grown to 40,000 households. He established Gia Định prefecture (or fu), comprising the two counties of Phước Long and Tân Bình; at that time, Bến Nghé fell under Tân Bình County.

=== Before and after the Civil War ===
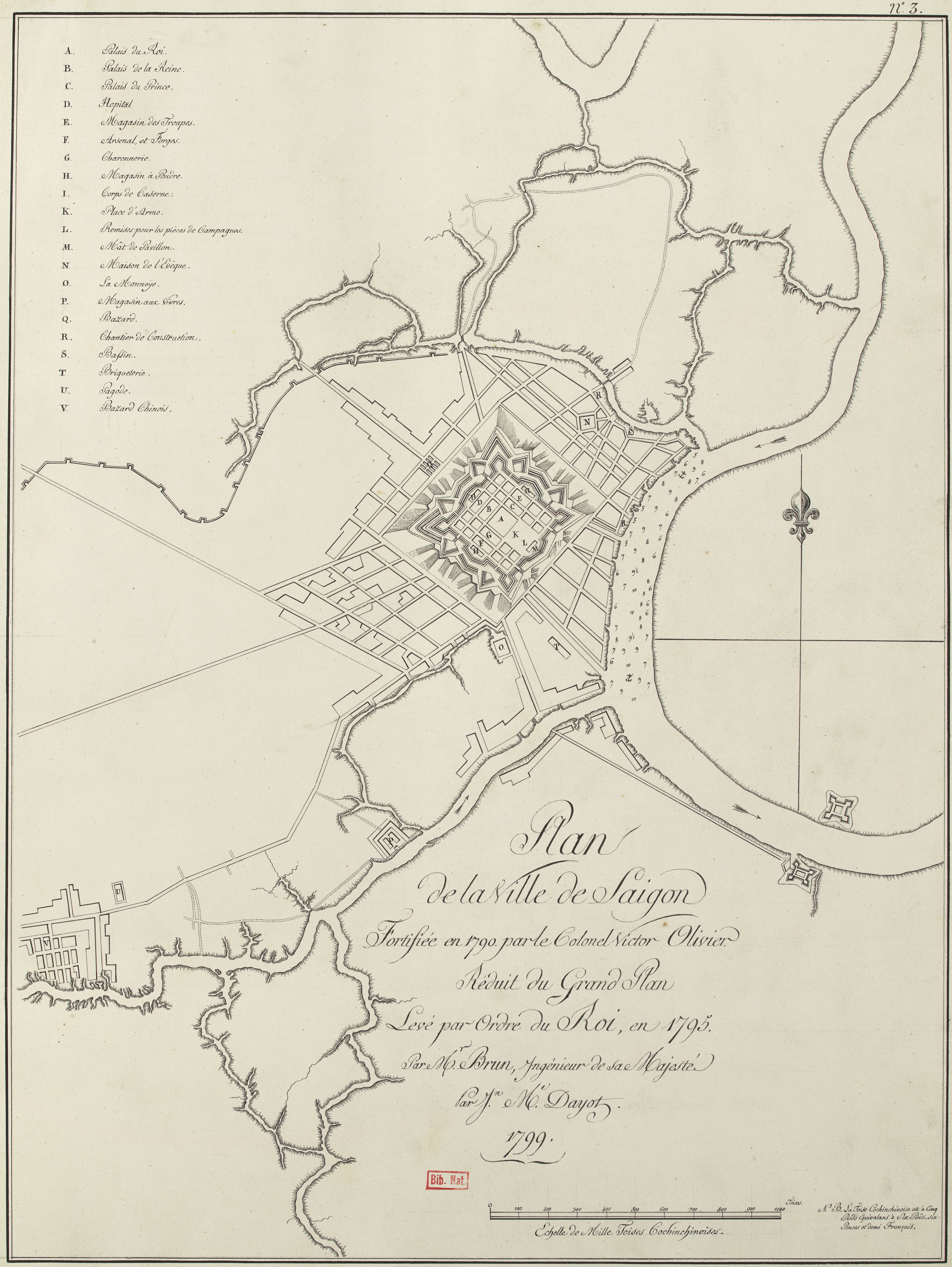
Map of Saigon 1795, drafted by Jean-Marie Dayot

From 1776 to 1783, the Tây Sơn had offended against Gia Định for 5 times, this region became a battleground between the Tây Sơn forces and the Nguyễn lords. In 1788, Nguyễn Ánh took back Gia Định; in 1790 he settled the Capital of Gia Định (Gia Định kinh) and constructed the Thành Quy (Citadel of Tortoise) or also known as Thành Bát Quái (Bagua or Eight Trigrams Citadel), first edition of Citadel of Saigon (or Gia Định), along with several facilities outside its walls—including a naval shipyard (Xưởng; known as the Chu Sư or Thủy shipyard—the precursor to the later Ba Son Shipyard), an elephant camp (xưởng Voi), a gunpowder factory (Trường thuốc súng), a detention center and prison (Khám đường và Ngục sở), and a diplomatic guesthouse (Sứ quán). Nguyễn Ánh implemented various policies to boost agricultural production and trade, which facilitated the economic recovery and development of Saigon–Gia Định, transforming it into a solid base for his military campaigns against the Tây Sơn.

Until the late 18th – beginning of 19th century, the port towns of Bến Nghé with Sài Gòn developed strongly, attracting foreign ships to trade in large numbers. Records of foreigners who arrived Bến Nghé – Sài Gòn at that time, this area consisted of two distinct settlements: Saigun (Sài Gòn) and Bingeh (Bến Nghé). Bingeh served as the administrative center and the site of a fortress, located on the western bank of the major river (means Saigon River or Bến Nghé River then). The settlement of Bingeh developed later than Saigun; its population only began to grow significantly after the Nguyễn Ánh – Tây Sơn war had come to an end.

=== Revolt and demolition of Gia Định Citadel ===
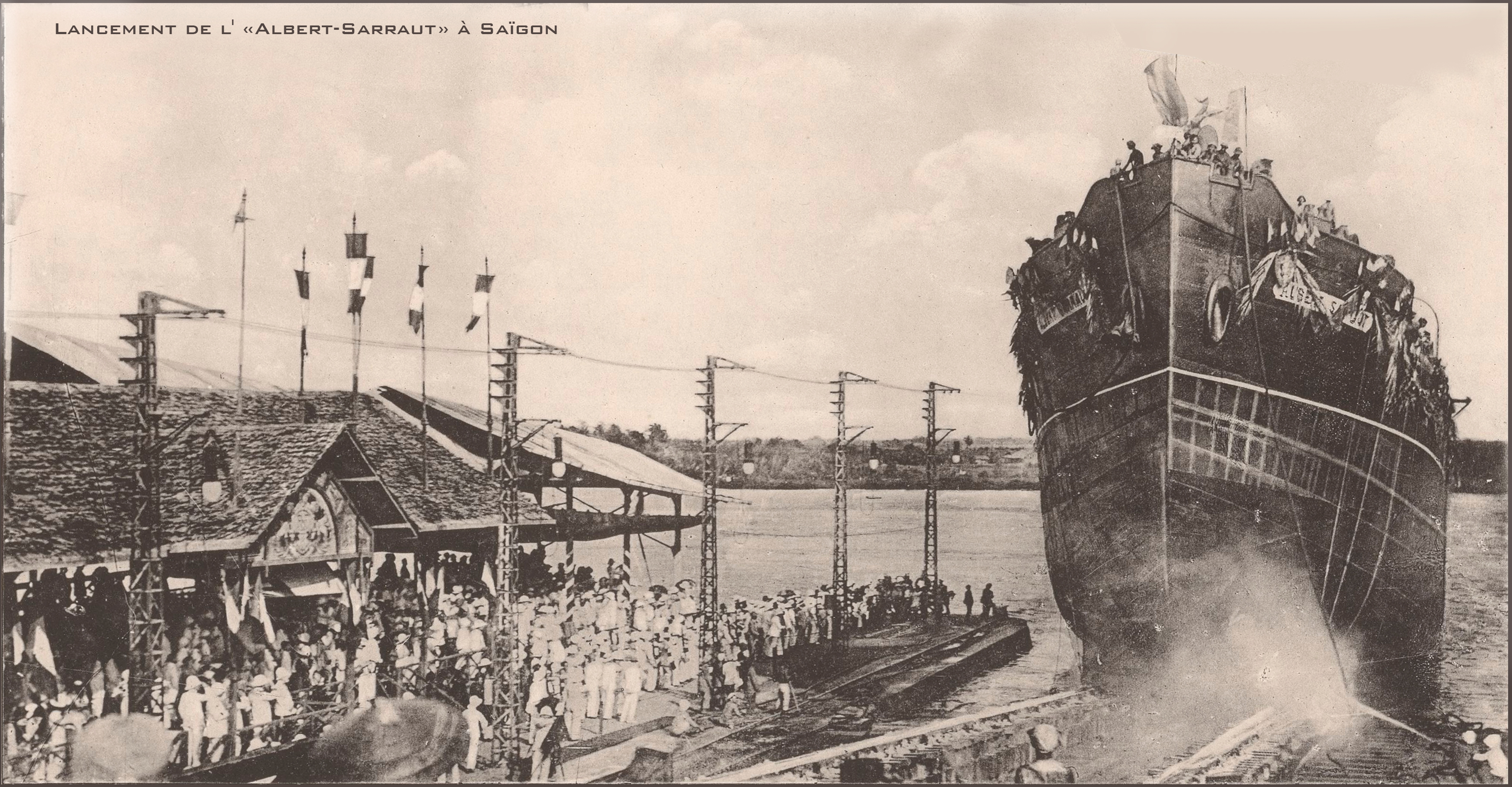
Launch of the ship that named after Albert Sarraut at Ba Son Shipyard

According to author Sơn Nam, the terrain of Bến Nghé consists of two distinct zones. To the north lies a high-lying hill area, where the citadel was constructed; to the south is a low-lying, marshy area along the Bến Nghé Canal. Most dwellings are stilt houses belonging to the local people, clustered closely along the canals and waterways; in market towns, one can find rows of houses featuring tiled roofs, wooden columns, and lime-plastered walls (typically owned by officials or wealthy landowners). Some market towns has been formed area: Bến Thành Market (the main market of Bến Nghé market system), Bến Sỏi Market, Điều Khiển Market, Thị Nghè Market, Tân Kiểng Market, etc. Boats are still the main means of transportation for people thanks to the intricate network of canals. After the Lê Văn Khôi revolt, Emperor Minh Mạng decided to demolish the Quy Citadel was demolished and replaced by a smaller new citadel, the Phoenix Citadel (thành Phụng); during this process, the markets and streets in Bến Nghé also suffered varying degrees of destruction.

=== The fall of Bến Nghé and establishment of Ville de Saigon ===
Map of Saigon in 1860, drafted by Paul Le Faucheur

Before the French Empire occupied Gia Định province, Bến Nghé was a conglomeration of about 40 villages with a population reaching 50,000 along the Bến Nghé Channel. When the Citadel of Gia Định fell in 1859, most of the urban area was destroyed and the inhabitants evacuated, leaving behind only Chợ Quán. This event was mentioned by Nguyễn Đình Chiểu in the Chạy giặc poem:

Bến Nghé của tiền tan bọt nước
Đồng Nai tranh ngói nhuốm màu mây.

— Nguyễn Đình Chiểu

The quote means fortunes vanish like foam upon the water at Bến Nghé and tiled roofs take on the war smoke like hues of the clouds at Đồng Nai.

After stabilizing the situation in the area, the French set about reorganizing Bến Nghé into a Western-style city, which they named Saigon. The name Bến Nghé was no longer officially used to refer the city anymore.

== Planning ==
On May 9, 2013, the Ho Chi Minh City Department of Planning and Architecture announced a decision by the City People’s Committee approving the 1:2,000-scale master plan for the city’s existing central area (Khu Trung tâm thành phố hiện hữu), or also known as Ho Chi Minh City Center. This area corresponds to the Ville de Saigon established by the French following their conquest of Gia Định province, a development that replaced the former Bến Nghé area, along with certain expansions to the south of the Bến Nghé Canal and to the east of the Thị Nghè Canal. Consequently, the landscape, functions, and amenities of Ho Chi Minh City’s center are set to undergo significant changes.

The area is bounded by:

- Northside: Saigon Bridge - Nguyễn Hữu Cảnh Blvd. - Nhiêu Lộc–Thị Nghè Canal - Võ Thị Sáu St.
- Westside: August Revolution St. - Nguyễn Thị Minh Khai St.
- Southside: Cống Quỳnh St. - Nguyễn Cư Trinh St. - Trần Hưng Đạo Blvd. - Nguyễn Thái Học Blvd. - Ông Lãnh Bridge - Hoàng Diệu St. - Đoàn Văn Bơ St.
- Eastside: Saigon River.

== Subzones ==
The center will be divided into five main functional zones:

=== Zone 1 ===
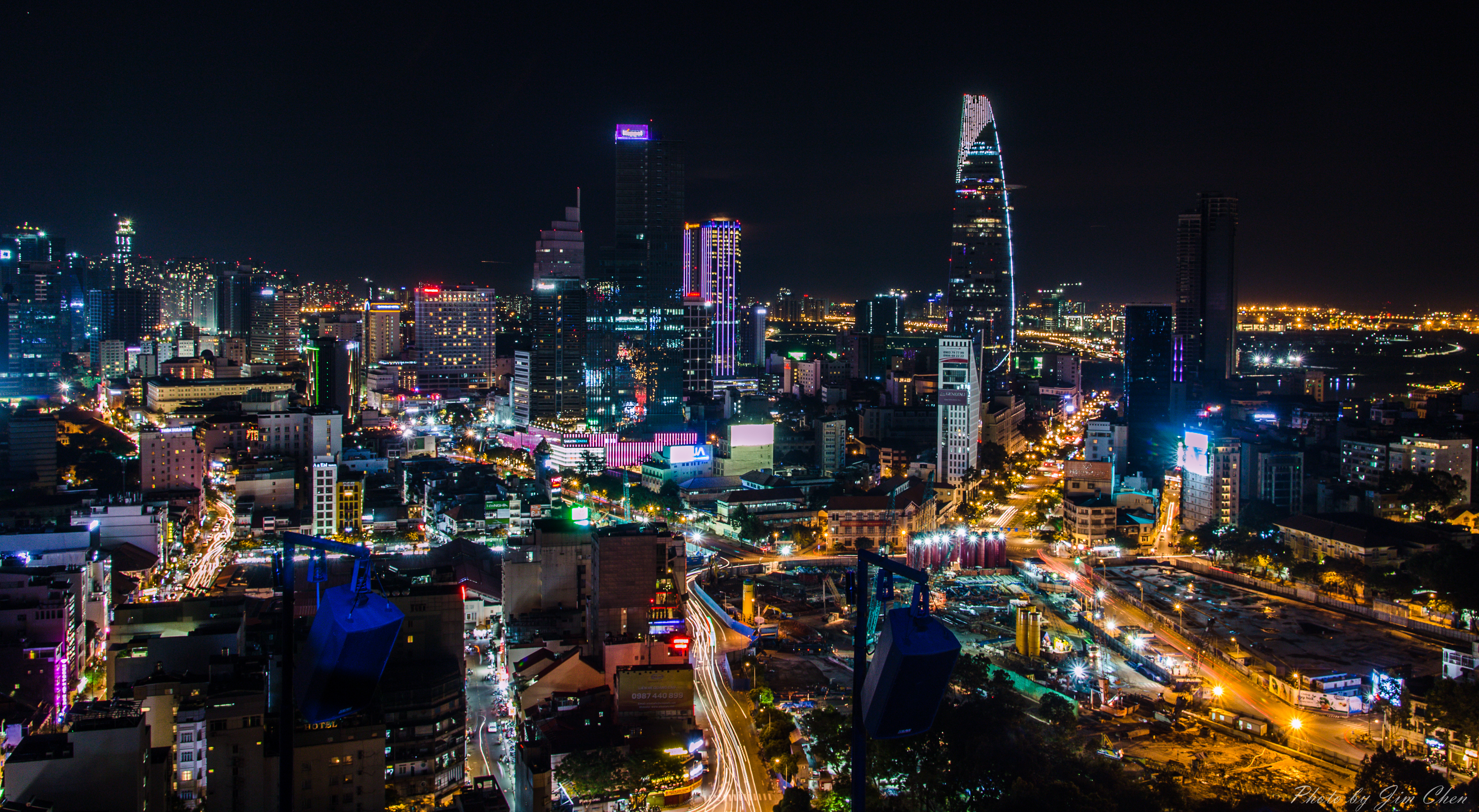
Downtown Ho Chi Minh City at night

Zone 1, also known as The Commercial and Financial Hub (Lõi trung tâm thương mại tài chính), is the core commercial and financial hub, developed for business, commerce, hospitality, tourism, administration, and public services. This entire zone is located within the boundaries of former District 1. It is bounded by Tôn Đức Thắng Boulevard to the east; Lê Lai and Lê Thánh Tôn Streets to the west; and Phạm Ngũ Lão Street and Hàm Nghi Boulevard to the south. Major streets in the zone are: Nguyễn Huệ Boulevard, Lê Lợi Boulevard, Hai Bà Trưng Street and Đồng Khởi Street; with some public spaces are Lam Sơn Square and September 23rd Park.

Some notable buildings here are, including the historic buildings such as Bến Thành Market, Ho Chi Minh City Opera House, Rex Hotel, Caravelle Hotel, Hotel Continental Saigon, Hotel Majestic, Grand Hotel Saigon; with the modern ones like Bitexco Financial Tower, Saigon Times Square, Sunwah Tower, Vietcombank Tower, Saigon Centre, Union Square Saigon, Park Hyatt Saigon Hotel, New World Saigon Hotel, A&B Tower. The 1935 Jamia Al Muslimin Mosque at 66 Đông Du Street, also known as the Saigon Central Mosque, is the oldest and best known of the twelve mosques in Ho Chi Minh City.

=== Zone 2 ===
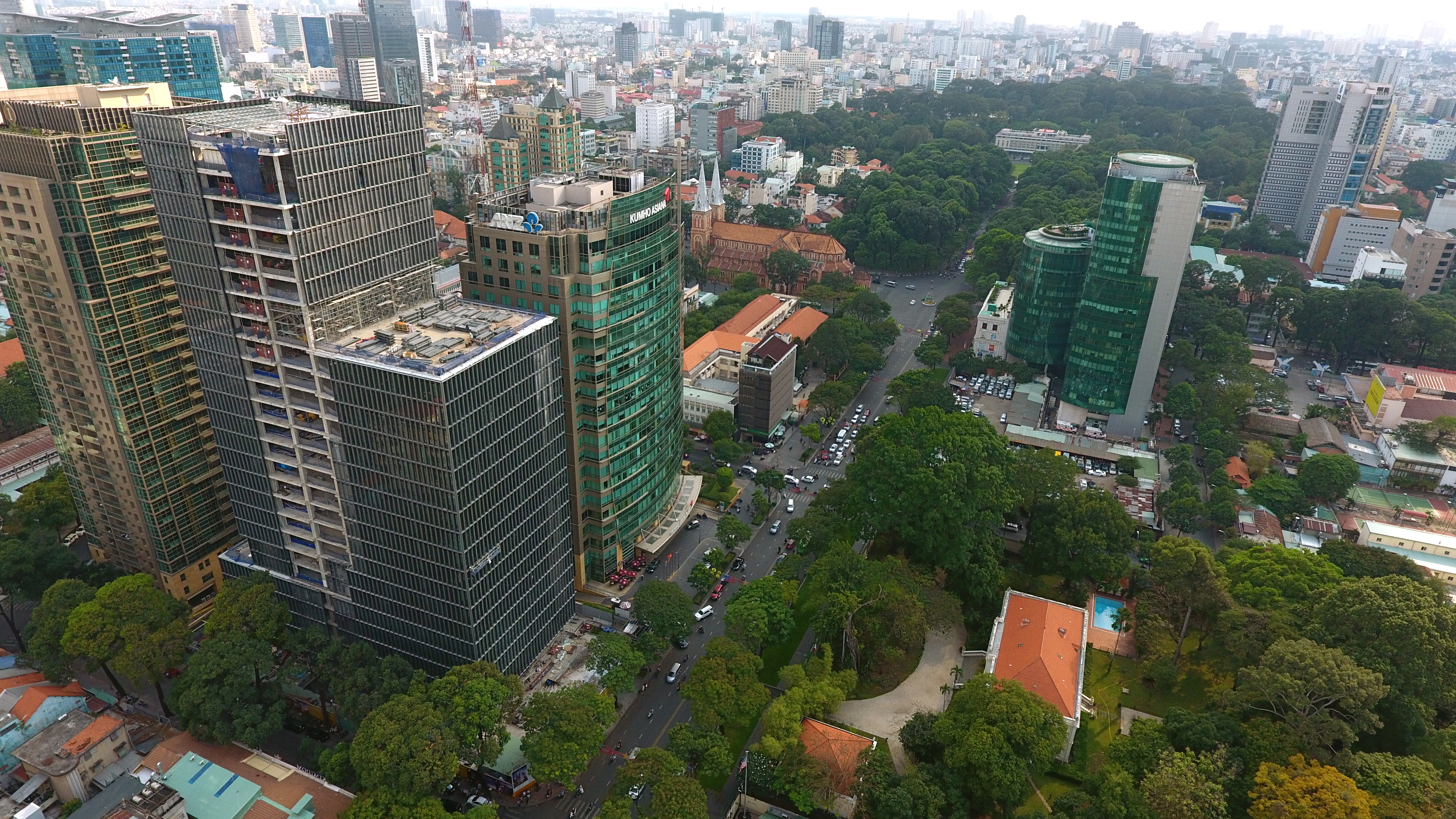
Lê Duẩn Boulevard seen from above

This zone is known as the Cultural and Historical Center (Khu Trung tâm văn hóa - lịch sử), developed for cultural, business, commercial, tourism, residential, and educational purposes. It is located within the boundaries of former District 1. It is bounded by the Thị Nghè Canal and Hoàng Sa Road to the north; Nguyễn Thị Minh Khai Street to the west; Cống Quỳnh Street to the south; and Lê Lai and Lê Thánh Tôn Streets to the east. Some other major thoroughfare in here are Lê Duẩn Boulevard, Phạm Ngọc Thạch Street, Nguyễn Du Street

Notable buildings in this area: Independence Palace, Diamond Plaza, Vincom Center Đồng Khởi, Saigon Trade Center, Ho Chi Minh City Radio and Television, Ho Chi Minh City Youth Cultural House, Notre-Dame Cathedral Basilica of Saigon, Bến Thành Theatre, IDECAF Theatre, Trần Đại Nghĩa High School for the Gifted and Children's Hospital No. 2; with public spaces such as Saigon Zoo and Botanical Gardens, Chi Lăng Park, Tao Đàn Park, April 30 Park, and Paris Commune Square

=== Zone 3 ===
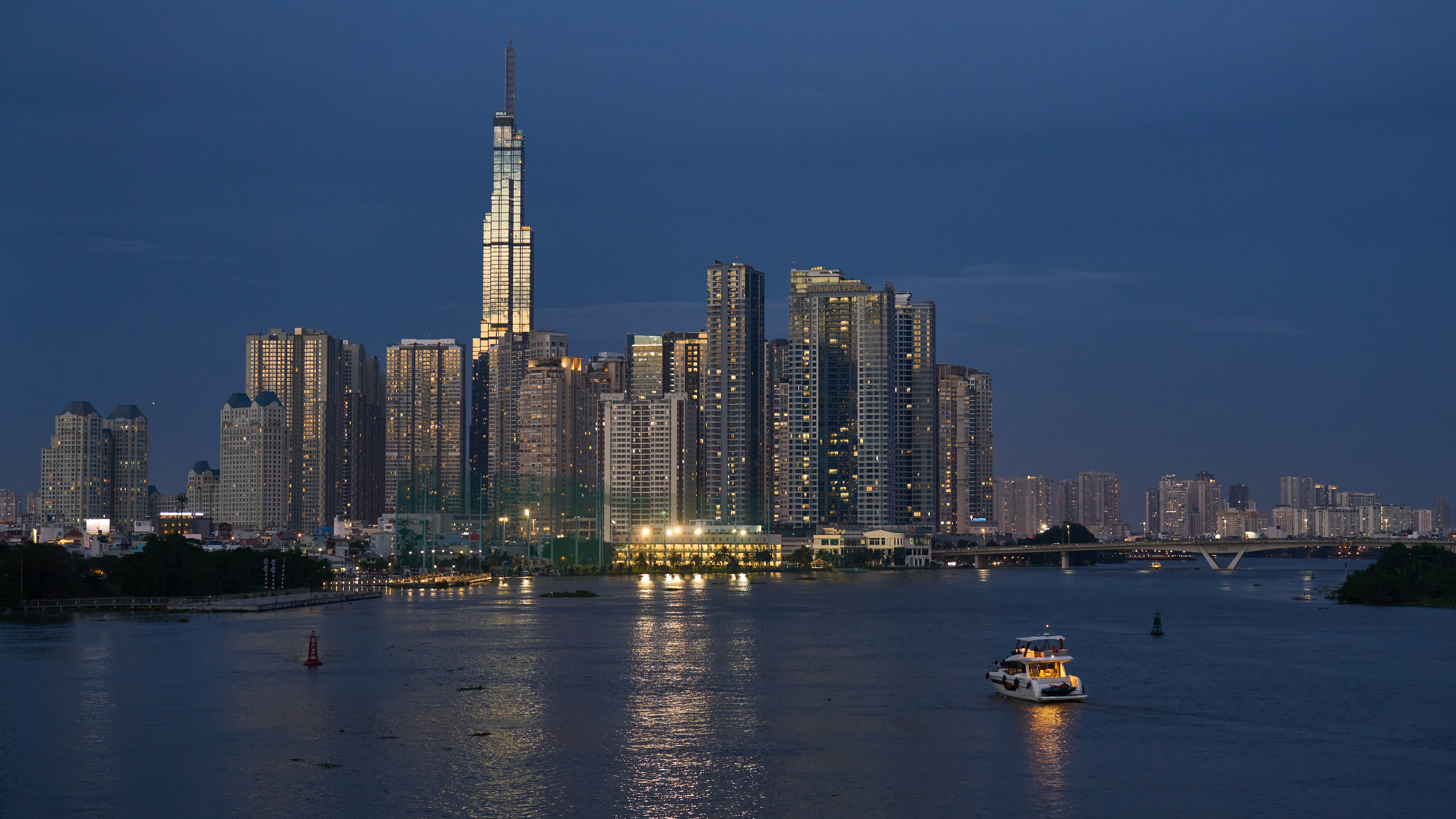
Skyscrapers in Thạnh Mỹ Tây

The zone is a multi-functional area along the west bank of the Saigon River (Khu bờ Tây sông Sài Gòn). It stretches from Saigon Bridge to Tân Thuận Bridge and encompasses parts of former Bình Thạnh District, District 1, and District 4; now Thạnh Mỹ Tây, Saigon and Xóm Chiếu, respectively. It is bounded by Saigon Bridge to the north; Nguyễn Hữu Cảnh and Tôn Đức Thắng Boulevard to the west; Nguyễn Tất Thành Street and the Tẻ Canal to the south; and the Saigon River to the east.

Notable places here: Dragon House, Bạch Đằng Quay, Mê Linh Square, Sài Gòn – Ba Son Development (Saigon Marina IFC), Sunwah Pearl & Saigon Pearl Apartment Complex, Vinhomes Central Park (Landmark 81).

=== Zone 4 ===
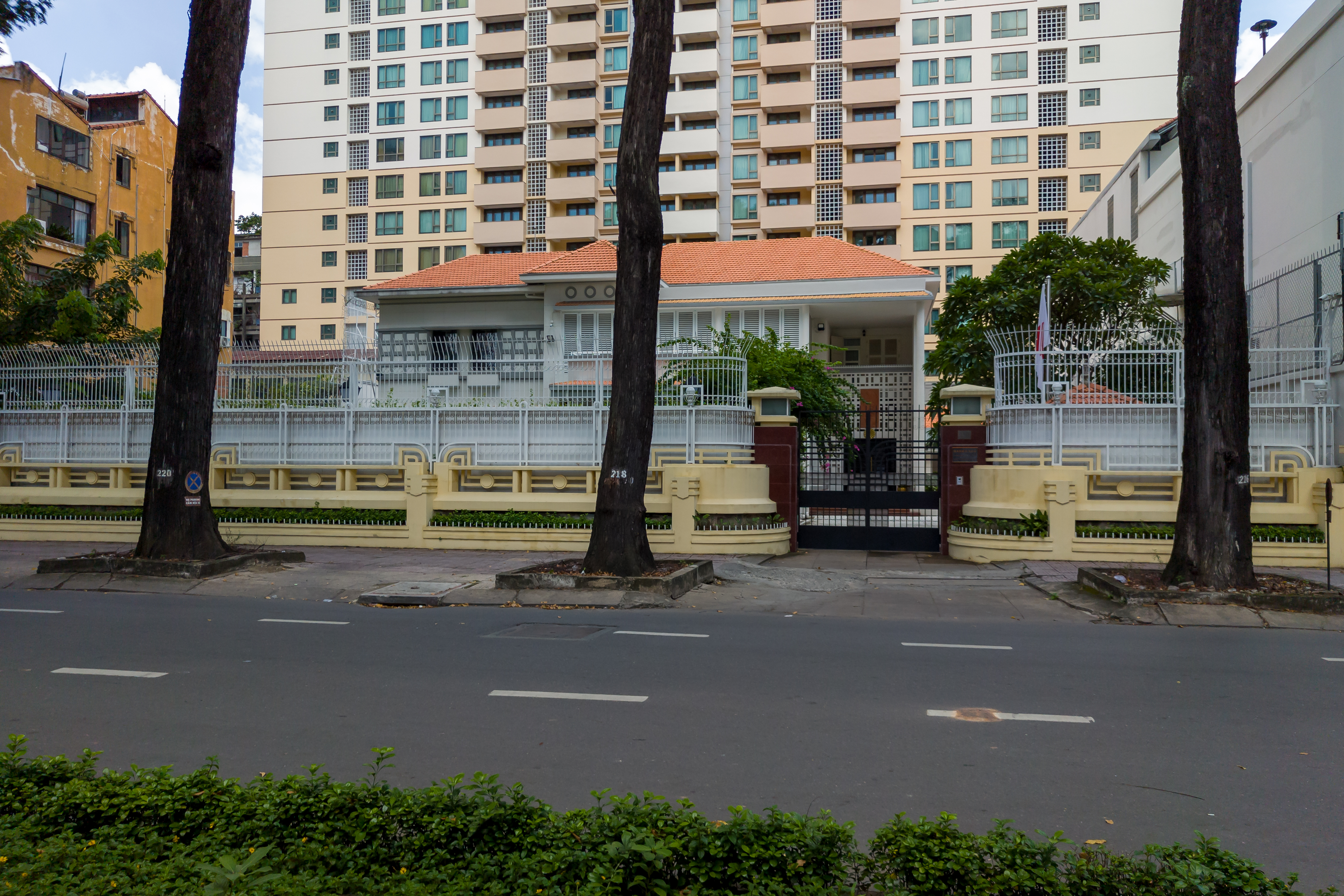
Consulate-General of Japan, Ho Chi Minh City with Sherwood Residence on Nguyễn Đình Chiểu Street

This is the Low-rise area (Khu thấp tầng), which includes many villas from the French colonial period that are to be preserved. This zone serves residential, cultural, educational, and low-rise commercial functions, and covers former Đa Kao, District 1 and Ward 6, District 3; now part of Saigon, Tân Định and Xuân Hòa, respectively).

This sub-zone is bounded by Thị Nghè Canal and Hoàng Sa Road (to the north), Võ Thị Sáu Street (to the west), August Revolution Street (to the south), and Nguyễn Thị Minh Khai Street (to the east). Notable places here: Lê Văn Tám Park, International Square (Turtle Lake), University of Architecture Ho Chi Minh City, University of Economics Ho Chi Minh City, Saigon University, Ho Chi Minh City Open University, Lê Quý Đôn High School, Nguyễn Thị Minh Khai High School, Marie Curie High School, War Remnants Museum, Children's House of Ho Chi Minh City, Southern Women's Museum, 5B Drama Theater, Hồ Xuân Hương Gymnasium, Ho Chi Minh City Dermatology and Denereology Hospital, Ho Chi Minh City Eye Hospital, Từ Dũ Hospital, Xá Lợi Pagoda, Thích Quảng Đức Monument Park, Hôtel des Arts Saigon - M Gallery Collection by Accor, Victory Hotel, Saigon Star Hotel, Ho Chi Minh City Party Committee and Conference Hall, Saigon Innovation Hub, Đa Kao Market, Nguyễn Đình Chiểu Apartment (original Lunch Lady restaurant is in here). Ho Chi Minh City Women's Cultural House, Tân Định Market, Tân Định Church, Tân Định Hospital and Tân Định Post are not directly located in it but next to the area.

=== Zone 5 ===
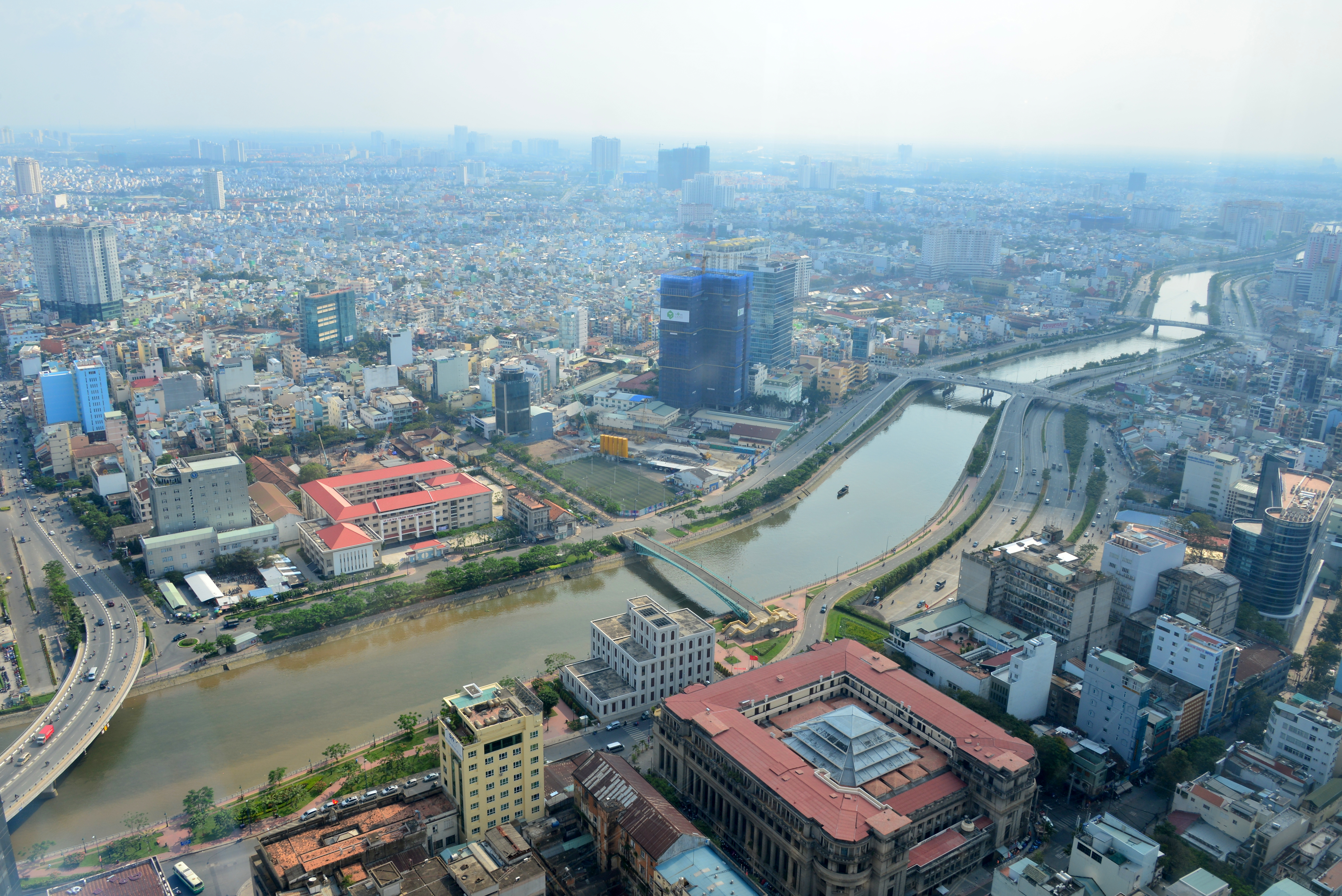
Bến Nghé Canal and both side in 2015

This is an area adjacent to the central core (Khu lân cận lõi trung tâm), developed with a commercial and business function that extends from Sub-zone 1. This sub-zone encompasses parts of former District 1 and District 4. Within the central core, this area contains the highest concentration of residential zones, ranging from older, collective-style housing complexes (Cư xá) to modern high-rise apartment buildings, mostly in former District 4, and the exisiting low-rise houses quarters. It is bounded by Hàm Nghi Boulevard and Phạm Ngũ Lão Street (to the north), Nguyễn Thái Học Boulevard and Cống Quỳnh Street (to the west), Hoàng Diệu Street (to the south), and Tôn Đức Thắng Boulevard and Nguyễn Tất Thành Street (to the east).

The Financial District, Saigon, where the headquarters of State Bank of Vietnam Region 2 Branch and Ho Chi Minh City Stock Exchange located is here. Some quarters here are famous for the nightlife or street foods such as International Crossroads (Phạm Ngũ Lão Street, Bùi Viện Street and Đề Thám Street), Vĩnh Khánh Street, Vĩnh Khánh Apartment. The other notable places: Mong Bridge, Ho Chi Minh City Museum of Fine Arts, One Central Saigon, Dân Sinh Market, Thái Bình Market, REE Tower, E.Town Central.

== Economy ==
Đồng Khởi Street, the most expensive shopping street in Vietnam with luxury hotels, shopping centers and complex high-rise buildings

As the area with the highest density of office space for lease in the city, and also planned as part of VIFC-HCM, Bến Nghé is home to numerous multinational corporations and companies across various industries such as logistics, assurance, technology, and manufacturing, opening offices or headquarters here. These include companies like CJ, Hafele, Heineken, Michelin, Nestlé, Procter & Gamble, Prudential, Samsung, Shopee, Shiseido, Toyota, TikTok, and Yang Ming; Big 4 accounting firms such as Deloitte, EY, KPMG, and PwC; and financial institutions and banks such as Deutsche Bank, HSBC, J.P. Morgan & Co., Standard Chartered, etc.

Hospitality here ranges from budget-friendly options in the Bùi Viện - Phạm Ngũ Lão area (the "Western Quarter") to luxury hotels in the city center, such as heritage hotels belonging to Saigontourist Group, as well as modern hotel brands from Vietnamese companies and corporations like Liberty and Liberty Central (owned by Quê Hương Liberty) or The Reverie Saigon, and multinationals chain like Hilton, Accor (Sofitel, Pullman, Novotel, M Gallery), Marriott (JW Marriott, Sheraton), etc.

This area also boasts the city's most vibrant retail market with high-end shopping malls and department stores such as Saigon Centre (featuring Takashimaya), Diamond Plaza, Vincom Center Landmark 81, Vincom Center Đồng Khởi, Union Square Vietnam, and Rex Arcade. It features boutiques from luxury jewelry, watch, fashion, and cosmetics brands like Audemars Piguet, Chanel, Dior, Hublot, Swarovski, Tiffany & Co., Tudor, Van Cleef & Arpels, Vertu, Yves Saint Laurent, and more.

== Transportation ==
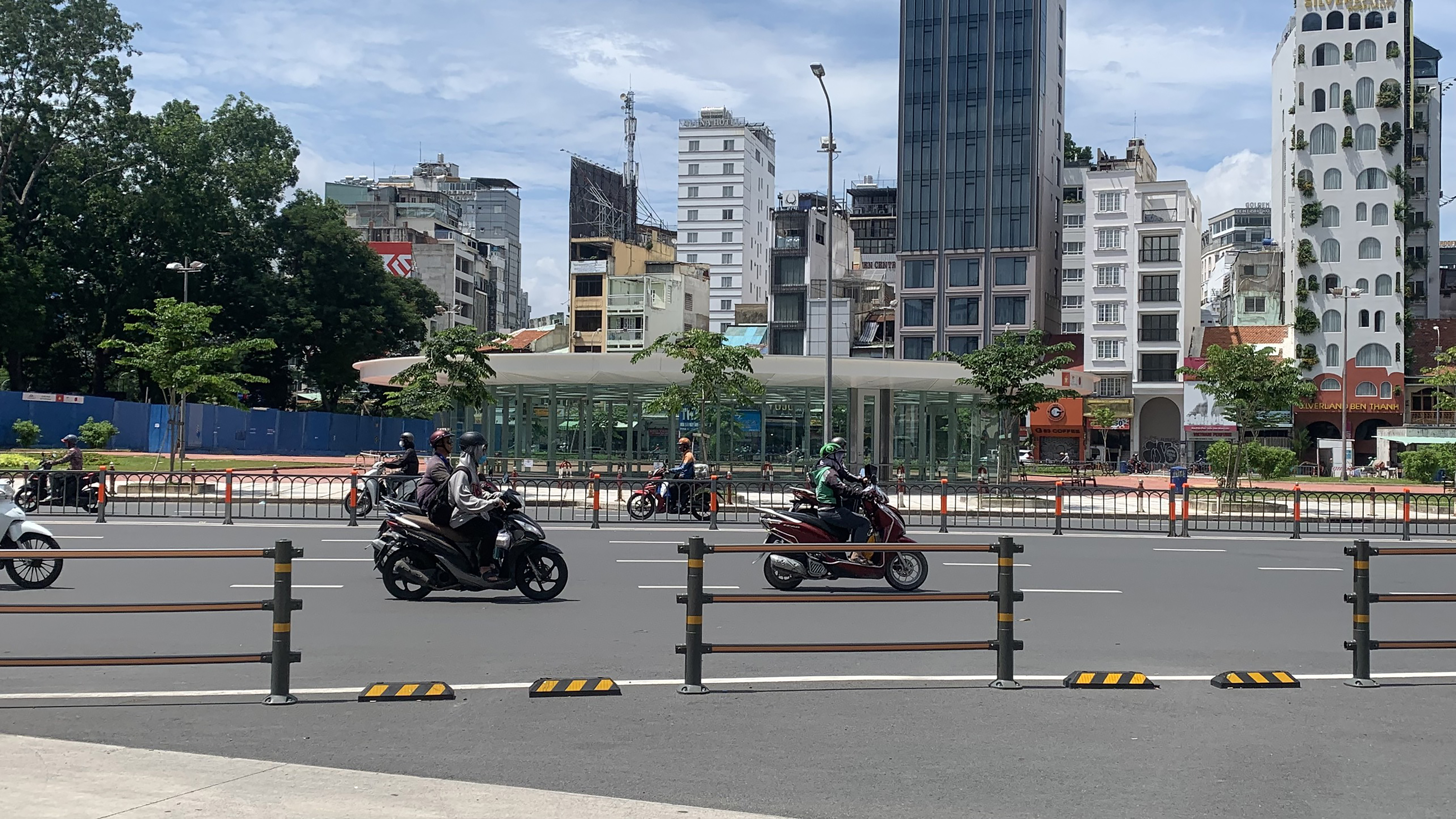
Bến Thành central station

Ho Chi Minh City plans to pilot a Low Emission Zone (Zone 1) from January 1, 2028, to December 31, 2029. This zone will encompass the entire 930-hectare central area, combined with the Thủ Thiêm New Urban Area, covering a total area of approximately 15.6 km^{2} (6.0 sq mi), with the aim of restricting gasoline and diesel-powered vehicles and promoting green transportation. The pilot period is expected from January 1, 2028 to the end of December 31, 2029. This area is selected because it has an expected public transport coverage of over 95% of the population within a radius of 500 m, the Metro Line 1 is being operated and has conditions to deploy a system of signs and surveillance cameras. Other metro lines in the city center area has been planned or under construction are Line 2, 3, 4, 12 and Line 9 with the Hoa Hung station, a transit with Line 2, located near the edge of the city centre.
