= Ratiphat Luengvoraphan =

Thai actor and model (born 2005)

- รติภัทร เหลืองวรพันธ์
- Born: 12 November 2005 (age 21); Bangkok, Thailand
- Other name: Aston (แอสตัน)
- Education: Chulalongkorn University
- Occupations: Actor; model
- Years active: 2023–present
- Agents: Sol Entertainment (2023); GMMTV (2023–present)
- Known for: Mon in Boys in Love; Thara in Weirdo-101
- Height: 1.76 m (5 ft 9 in)

Ratiphat Luengvoraphan (Thai: รติภัทร เหลืองวรพันธ์; born 12 November 2005), nicknamed Aston (Thai: แอสตัน), is a Thai actor and model known for his roles in Boys in Love (2025) and Weirdo-101 (2026).

He also represented Team GMMTV at the Star Magic All-Star Games 2026 basketball tournament, being recognized as one of the Mythical Five players.

== Early life and education ==
Ratiphat was born on 12 November 2005 in Bangkok, Thailand. After graduating from Harrow International School, he is currently studying arts and science in integrated innovation in Chulalongkorn University's international programme.

== Career ==
Ratiphat began his career through modeling represented by Sol Entertainment before joining GMMTV in October 2023. Ratiphat first entered the entertainment industry by starring in the 2025 boys' love television series Boys in Love alongside acting partner Puttipong Jitbut (Chokun). On 25 November 2025, during the GMMTV 2026: Magic Vibes Maximized event, Ratiphat and Puttipong would reunite for a new project. The upcoming television series 17th Spring will be a coming-of-age story that addresses HIV awareness.

== Filmography ==
=== Television series ===
Key
†	Denotes television productions that have not yet been released

Year	Title	Role	Network	Notes	Ref.
2025	Boys in Love	"Mon" Rawin Damrongtham	GMM 25	Main role	
2026	To Love and Cherish	"Yai" Rangsiman Metharawi	TrueVisions Now	Supporting role	
2026	Weirdo-101	Thara	GMM 25	Supporting role	
TBA	17th Spring †	Marn	TBA	Main role	
TBA	The Gentlemen's Blood †	TBA	TBA	Main role	
TBA	Shooting Stars †	TBA	TBA	Supporting role	

=== Music video appearances ===
Year	Title	Artist	Label	Ref.
2024	"รับฉันหน่อย (Pick Me Up)"	Slow Sundae	Club After Class	
2025	"Lesson One"; Boys in Love OST	Barcode Tinnasit	GMMTV Records	
2026	"ปิ๊งป่อง (PINGPONG)"	ily	XOXO Entertainment	

== Discography ==
=== Singles ===
==== Digital Singles ====
===== Soundtrack appearances =====
Year	Title	Soundtrack	Label	Ref.
2025	"ฮ็อป ฮ็อป ฮ็อป (Stop Clock)" with Chokun Puttipong	Boys in Love OST	GMMTV Records	

== Fan meetings ==
Solo

Title	Date	Venue	Ref.
Sincerely Waiting to Meet You: Aston Fan Sign in China	2 August 2026	China	

Joint

Title	Date	Venue	Notes	Ref.
Boys in Love Final EP. Fan Meeting	6 June 2025	Siam Pavalai Royal Grand Theater, Siam Paragon	With Boys in Love cast	
GMMTV Fan Day 26 in Vietnam	23 November 2025	Bến Thành Theatre, Ho Chi Minh City	With Boys in Love cast	
Weirdo-101 Final EP. Fan Meeting	16 October 2026	Iconsiam Hall, Iconsiam	With Weirdo-101 cast	
