= Union Square Saigon =

Union Square
- Tứ giác Eden
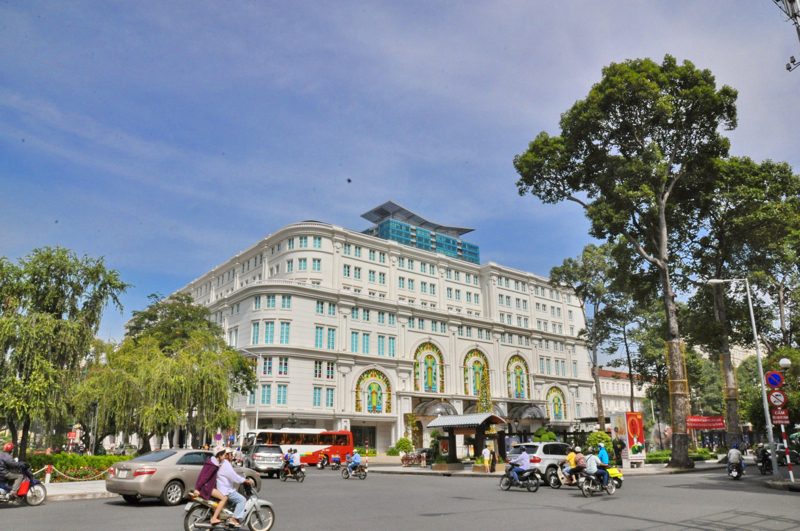
- Union Square before renovating for Mandarin Oriental, Saigon on Lê Lợi Boulevard
- Location: Bến Nghé, District 1, Ho Chi Minh City, Vietnam
- Coordinates: 10.776480°N 106.701606°E
- Address: 53 Lê Thánh Tôn – 171 Đồng Khởi Street – 6A Lê Lợi Boulevard – 116 Nguyễn Huệ Boulevard, Saigon
- Opened: October 10, 2012; 14 years ago
- Previous names: Vincom Center A
- Developer: Vingroup
- Owner: VIPD Group
- Num. of stores: 25
- Floor area: 38,000 m^{2} (410,000 sq ft); Total: 91,000 m^{2} (980,000 sq ft)
- Floors: 9 (+6 basements)
- Parking: 190 cars and 2300 motorbikes at B4, B5, B6
- Public transit: L1 Opera House station
- Website: UNION SQUARE Vietnam

Union Square Saigon, also known as Union Square Vietnam or simply Union Square (stylized as UNIONSQUARE) is a building of luxury shopping centre featuring boutiques of several high-end brands in fashion, jewelry or interior design, with hotel located in the centre of Ho Chi Minh City, Vietnam, which opened to the public on 10 October 2012.

The building contains a covered shopping mall and a Mandarin Oriental Hotel. Located on a 4-way urban block, including streets of Đồng Khởi, Lê Thánh Tôn, Nguyễn Huệ and Lê Lợi, opposite the Ho Chi Minh City Hall and Saigon Opera House.

== History ==
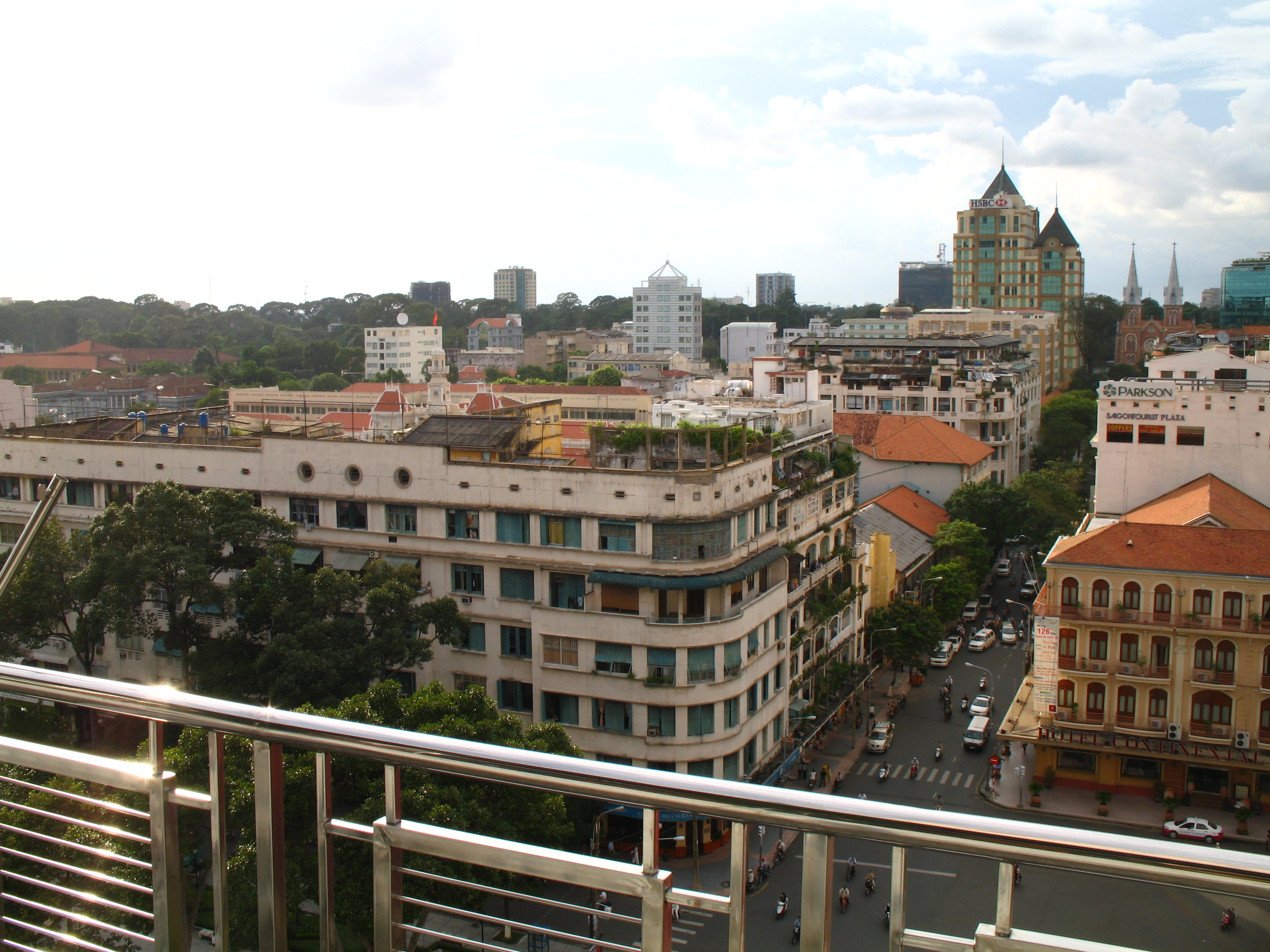
The Eden Center before being demolished, looks toward the Paris Commune Square

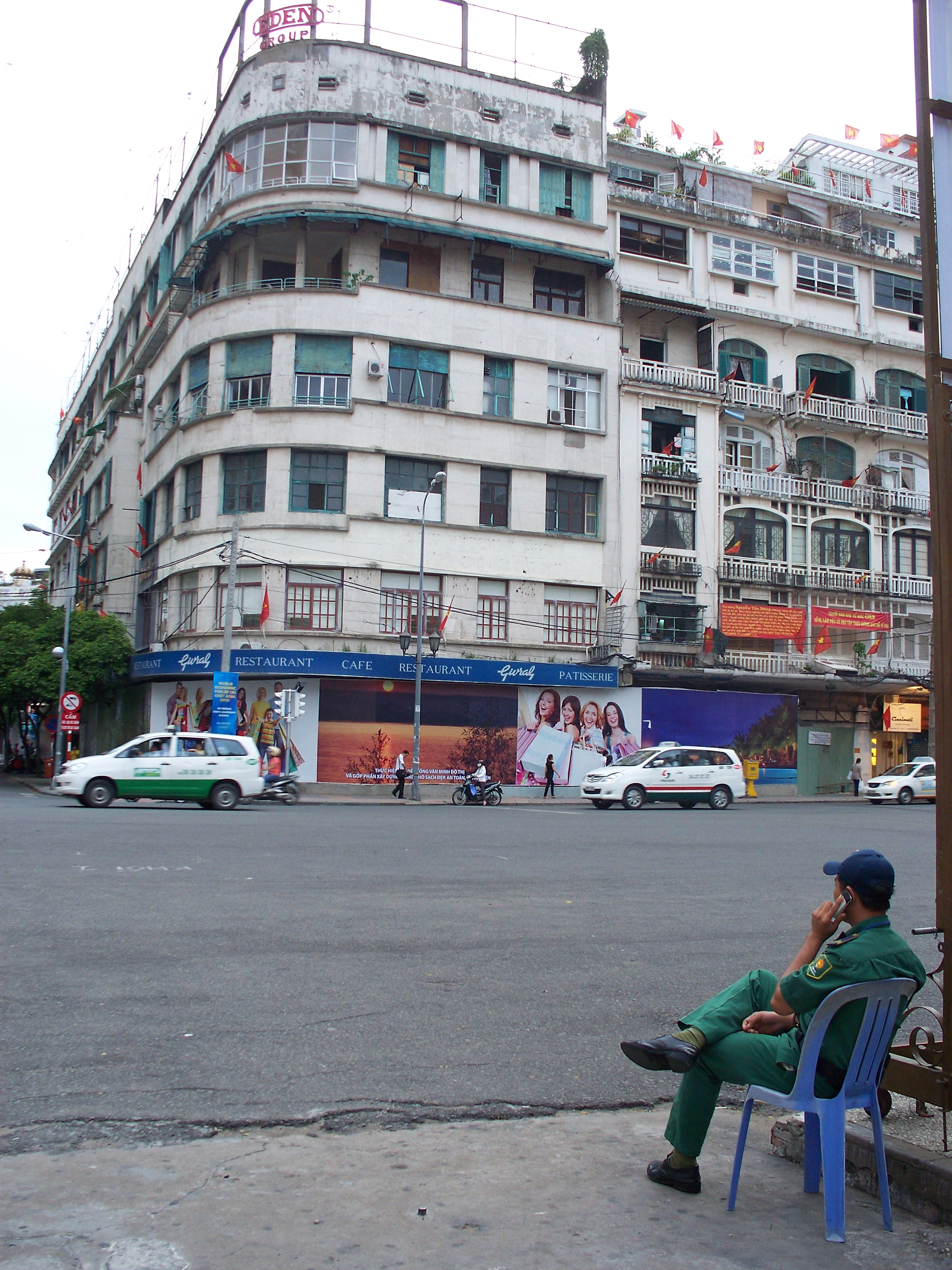
Last days of Eden Center before demolition

=== Passage Eden ===
In the past, this was the place of Eden Center (Thương xá Eden), also known as Passage Eden (Hành lang Eden), the building then was a mixed-used one with apartment for the half upper floors and the rest are for retail and movie theater named Eden, the theater name was generally taken to called the whole building.

In December 1998, Ho Chi Minh City People's Committee issued Decision No. 6780 approving the adjustment of the general planning of District 1, according to which the Eden quadrangle (limited to 4 routes Đồng Khởi – Lê Thánh Tôn – Nguyễn Huệ – Lê Lợi, Bến Nghé ward, District 1) is included in the planning of the Administrative - Commercial Center. At the same time, according to the 5-year land use plan (2006-2010) in District 1 (approved by the City People's Committee in Decision 3291 in July 2008), the project "Expansion of Eden Commercial Center at 108 Nguyễn Huệ with an area of nearly 0.9 hectares with an implementation plan from 2006-2010" was determined. According to the Compensation and Site Clearance Board of District 1, it is expected that the handover of the site will be basically completed before April 30, 2010 with a total of 1,493 billion VND used for relocation and site clearance. However, the site clearance was not done until December 2010.

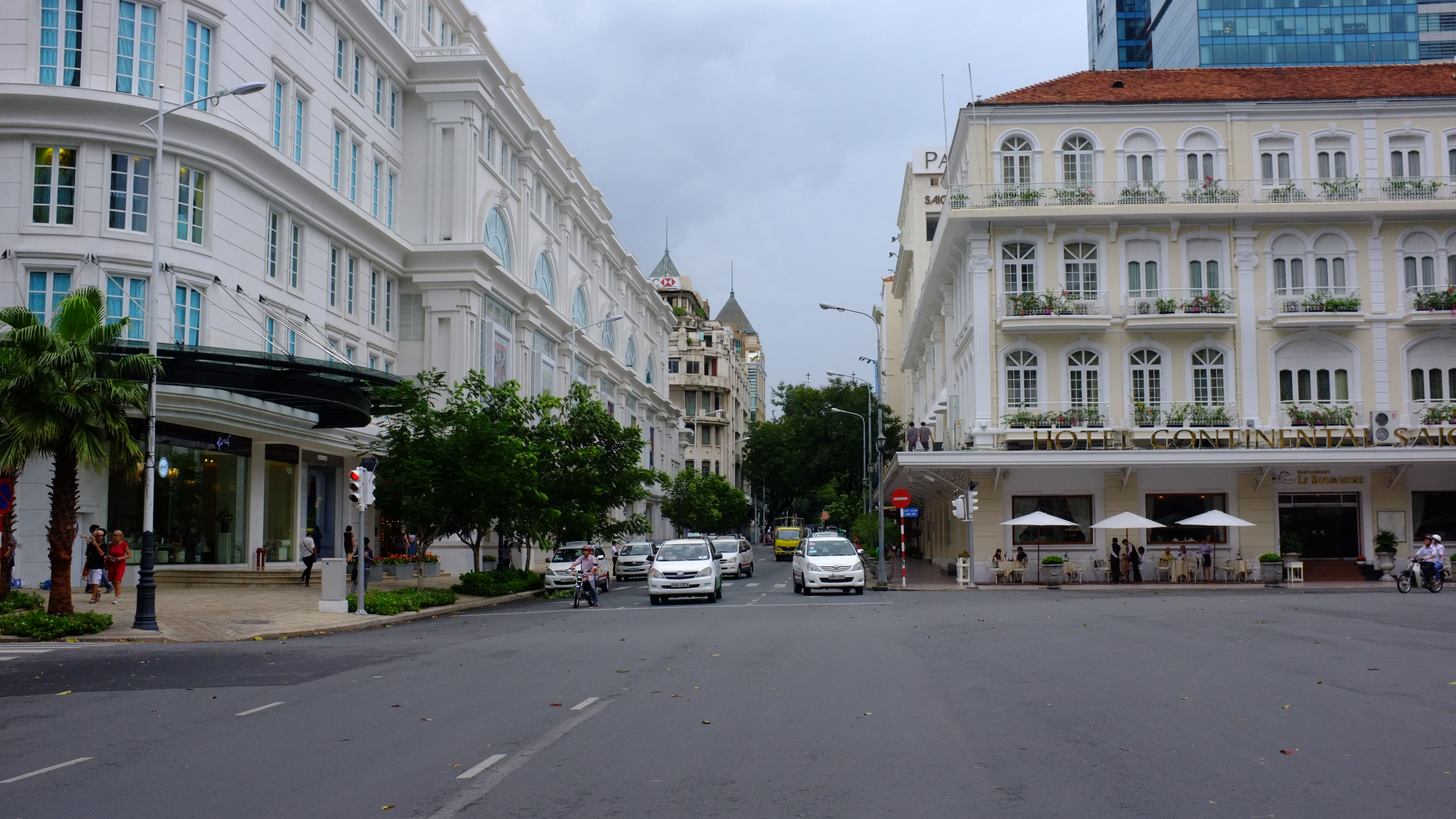
Union Square Saigon looks toward the Paris Commune Square

=== Vincom Center A ===
The construction was started in early 2011, the project was then renamed to Vincom Center A by Vincom (now is Vingroup) and opened in October 2012, it was a part of Vincom Center Complex in Ho Chi Minh City along with Vincom Center B (which is now Vincom Center Đồng Khởi), the whole project was one of their first properties in this city. Both have distinguished functions, the Vincom Center A, a building with New Classical architecture, is for luxury shopping mall, convention center and a Vinpearl hotel (Vinpearl Luxury Saigon Hotel was planned to open here), while the Vincom Center B with modern architecture is for office tenants, apartment and more affordable shopping mall with game arcade.

=== Union Square and Mandarin Oriental, Saigon Hotel ===
Five months after opening in 2013, Phạm Nhật Vượng, the CEO of Vingroup, decided to sell Vincom Center A for VIPD Group, a business that related to Trương Mỹ Lan, the building then was renamed into Union Square and kept it until now. The Vinpearl Luxury Saigon Hotel was also replaced by the Mandarin Oriental, Saigon Hotel, it was announced in May 2018 that it was expected to inaugurate in 2019 (or 2020); however, the hotel still not completed to open.

== Features ==
Café U, a coffee shop in Lower Level 2 (LL2) of Union Square Saigon surrounds the Exit 4

Level	Use
9	Rooftop space
8	Mandarin Oriental, Saigon
7	Mandarin Oriental, Saigon
6	Mandarin Oriental, Saigon
5	Mandarin Oriental, Saigon
4	Restaurants
3	Le Club, The Reverie Boutique, Matcha Kyoto, NOI Premium Wood Fire, Pāo Pāo, Vietnam House
2	Tiffany & Co. Office, Audemars Piguet, APM Monaco, Bentley Home, Bang & Olufsen, Bvlgari, Canali, Cartier, Culti Milano, Dior, Fendi, Frette, Hermès, Kiton, Narumi, Piaget SA, Rene Caovilla, Tory Burch LLC
1	Audemars Piguet, Bvlgari, Cartier, Chopard, Dior, Hermès, Hublot, Loewe, Patek Philippe, S&S Watches & Jewelry, Tiffany & Co., Van Cleef & Arpels, Café Carré
LL1	Socié, Eurasia Concept Showflat, 20 Carats, Hermès
LL2	Amenti Atelier, Antico Fornaio, Bliss, Café U, LysLan Chocolatier, Matcha Kyoto, Noko, Starbucks
LL3	Rue Miche
B4–B6	Parking

=== Notes ===
- LL stands for Lower-Level
- The Mandarin Oriental, Saigon Hotel has 228 rooms with 6 restaurants and bars. Hotel lobby at Level 1 on Lê Lợi Boulevard
- The Café Carré at Level 1 located at the loggia of the building on corner of Nguyễn Huệ and Lê Lợi Blvd
- LL2 brands are coffee and sweet shop, except Amenti Atelier is a curated boutique and gift shop

== Transportation ==
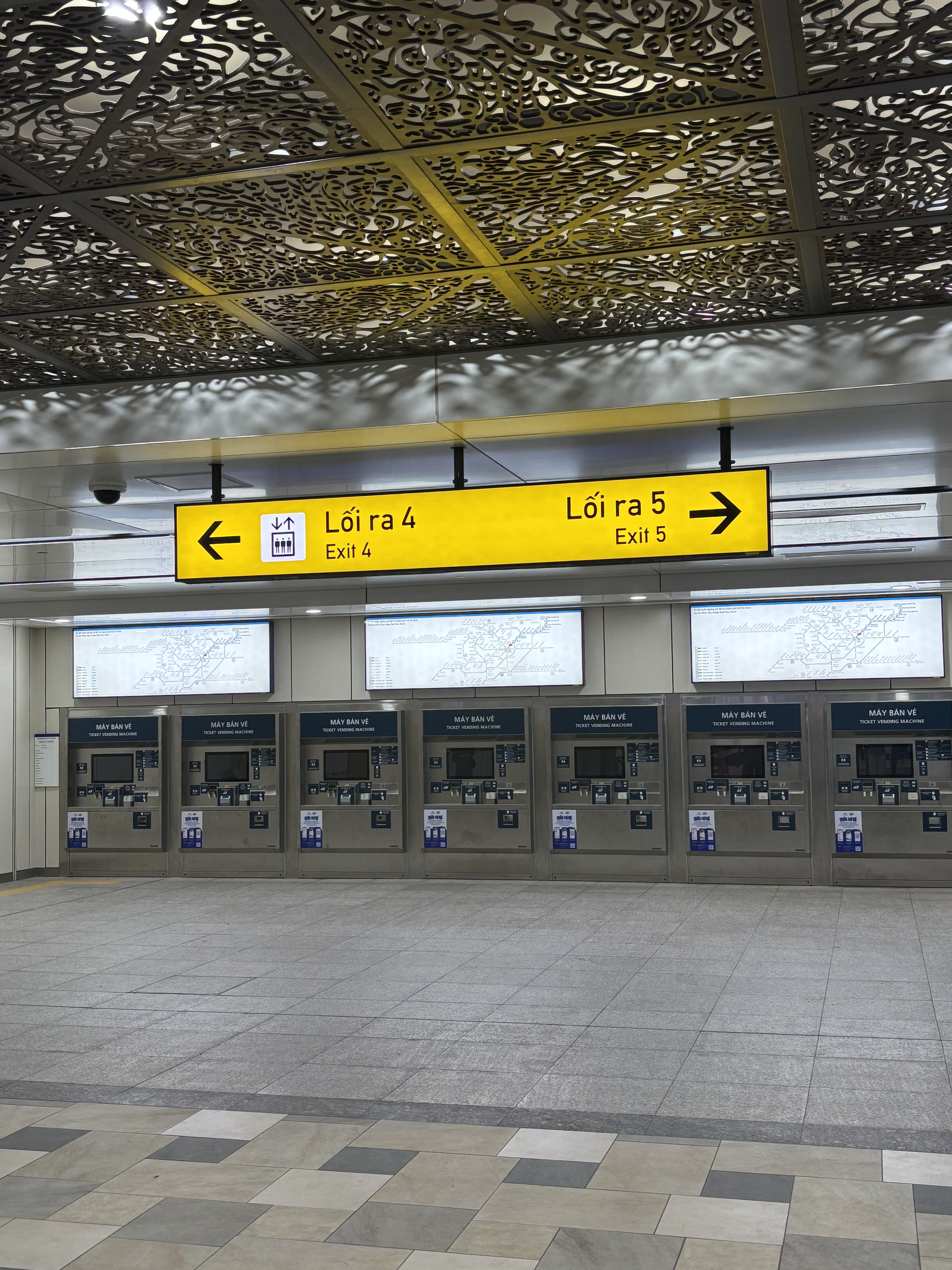
Exit 4 direct sign, leads to the mall, at the ticket vending machine area

The Union Square is directly connected to Opera House station underground by the Exit 4 from the station lead to the basement of the building, at the F&B area, it was opened in 2025.

== Gallery ==
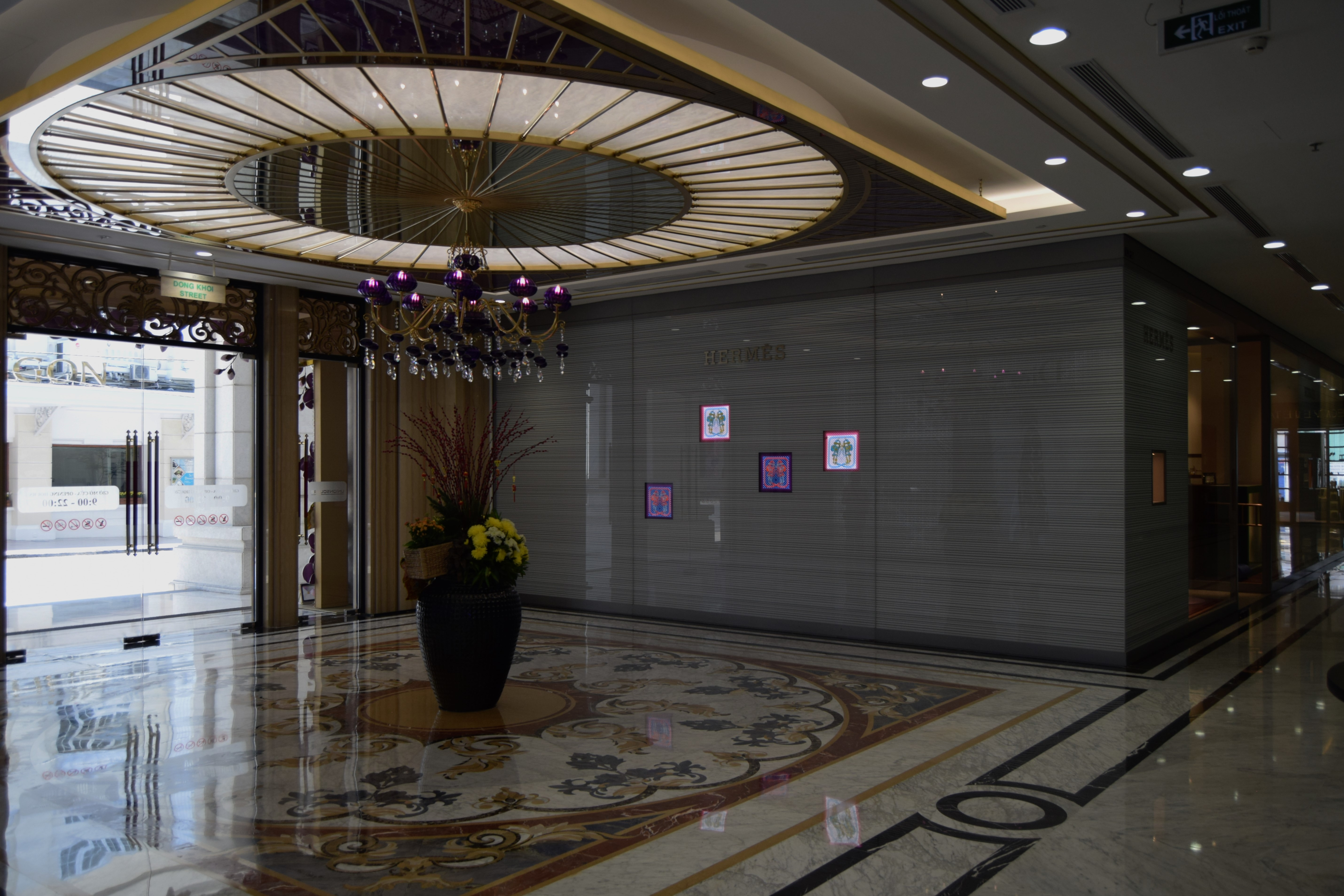
The mall lobby

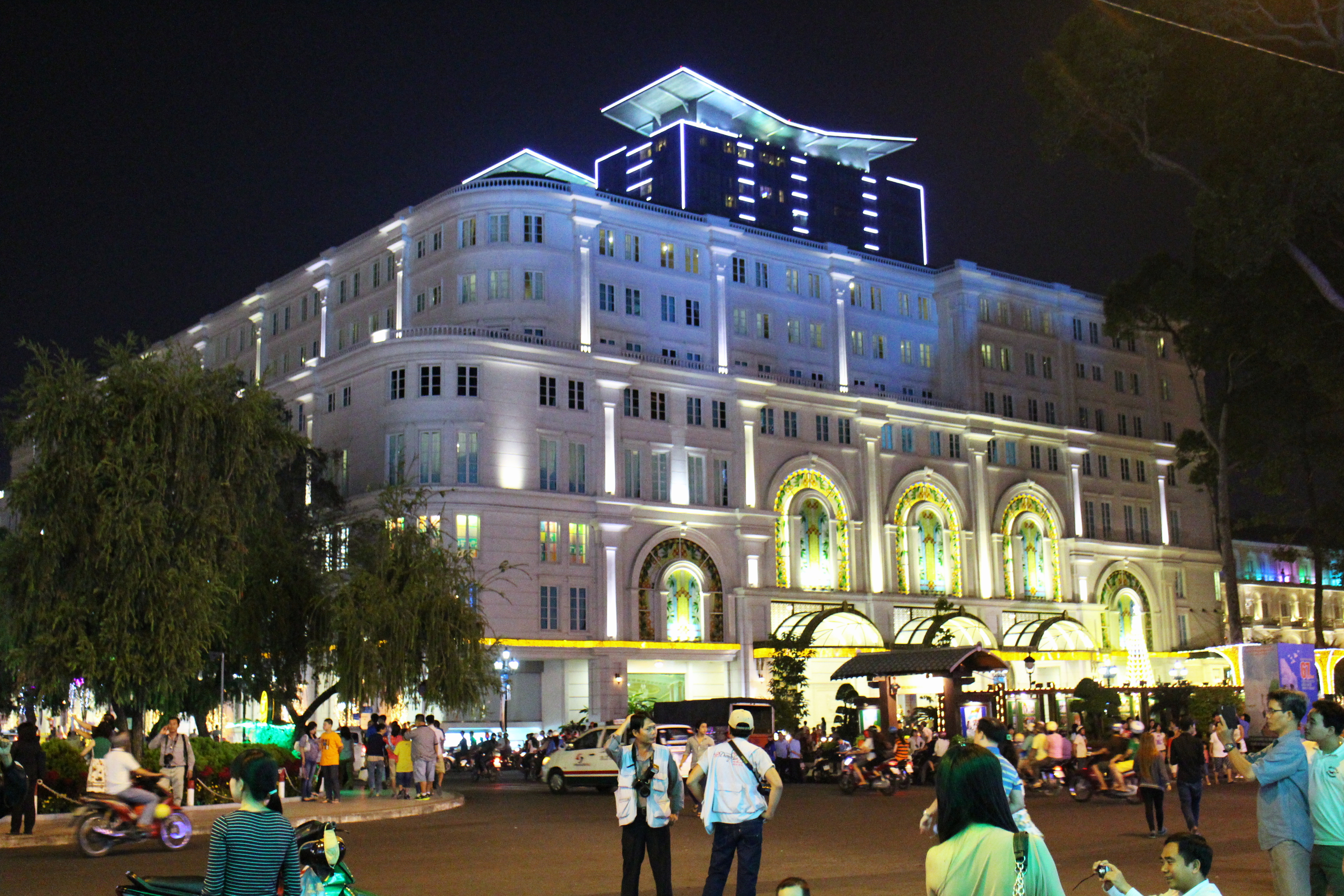
Union Square Saigon at night on Lê Lợi Boulevard

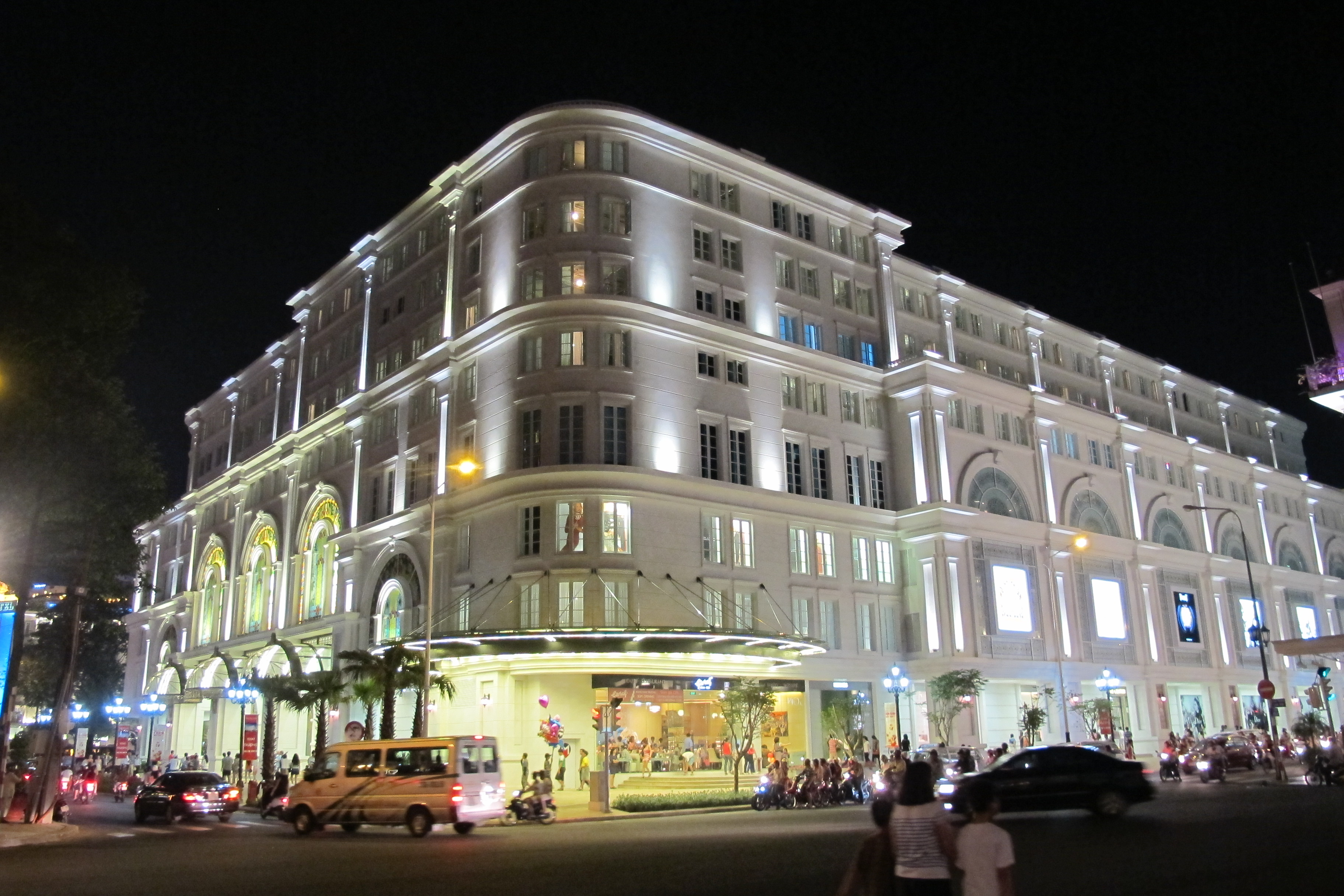
The mall on the corner of Lê Lợi - Đồng Khởi

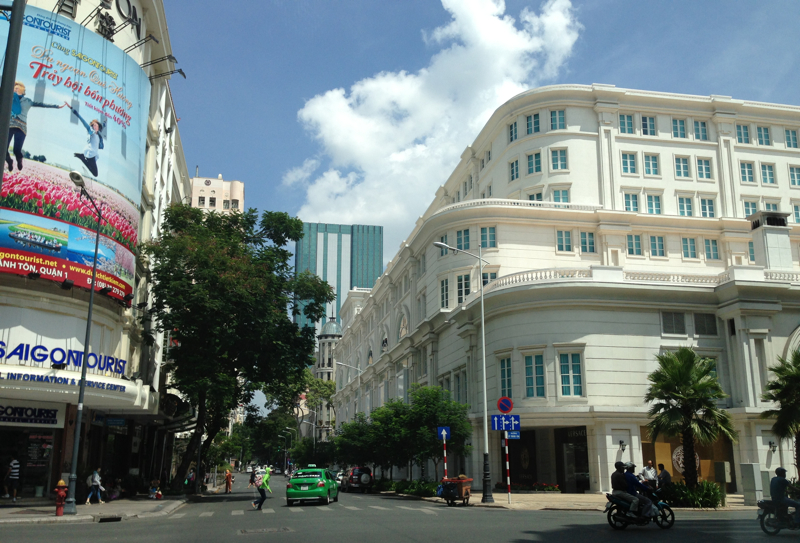
The mall on corner of Đồng Khởi - Lê Thánh Tôn

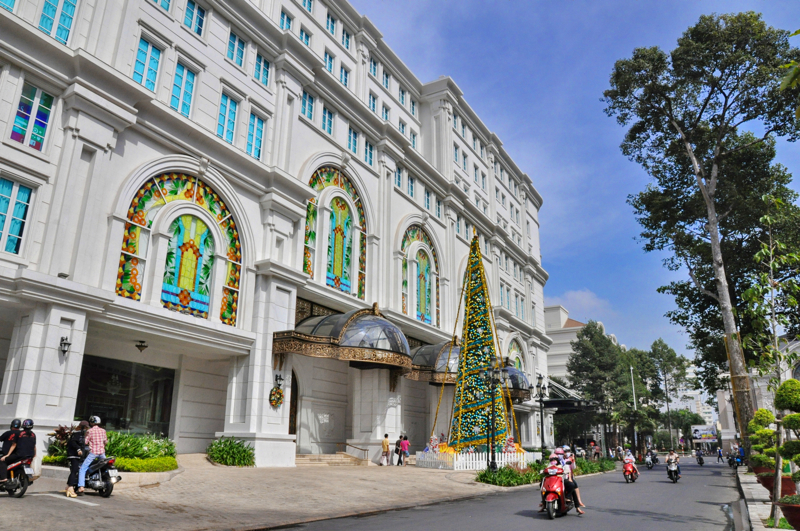
Union Square Saigon decorated for Christmas season

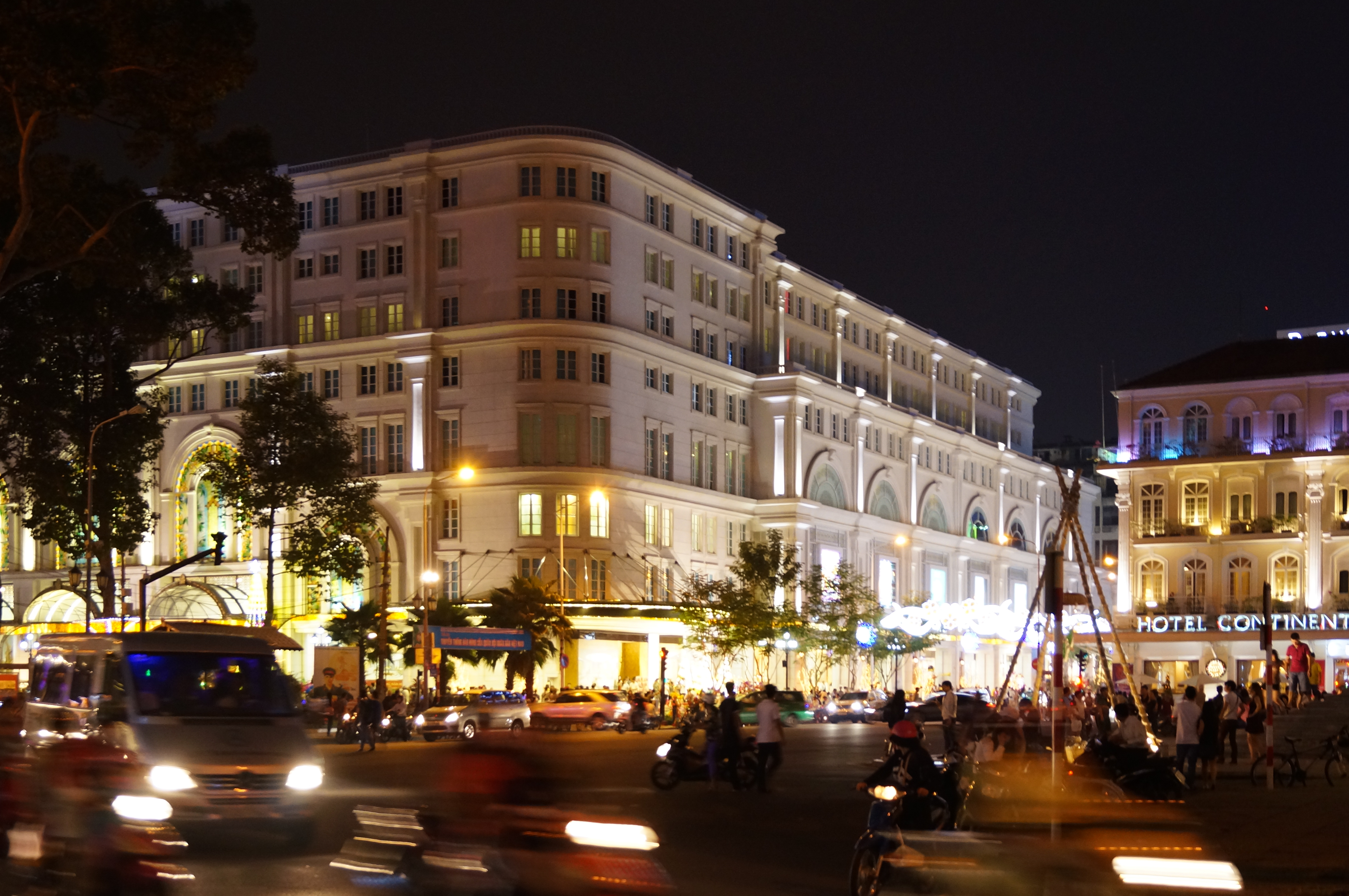
Union Square Saigon viewed from the Caravelle Hotel

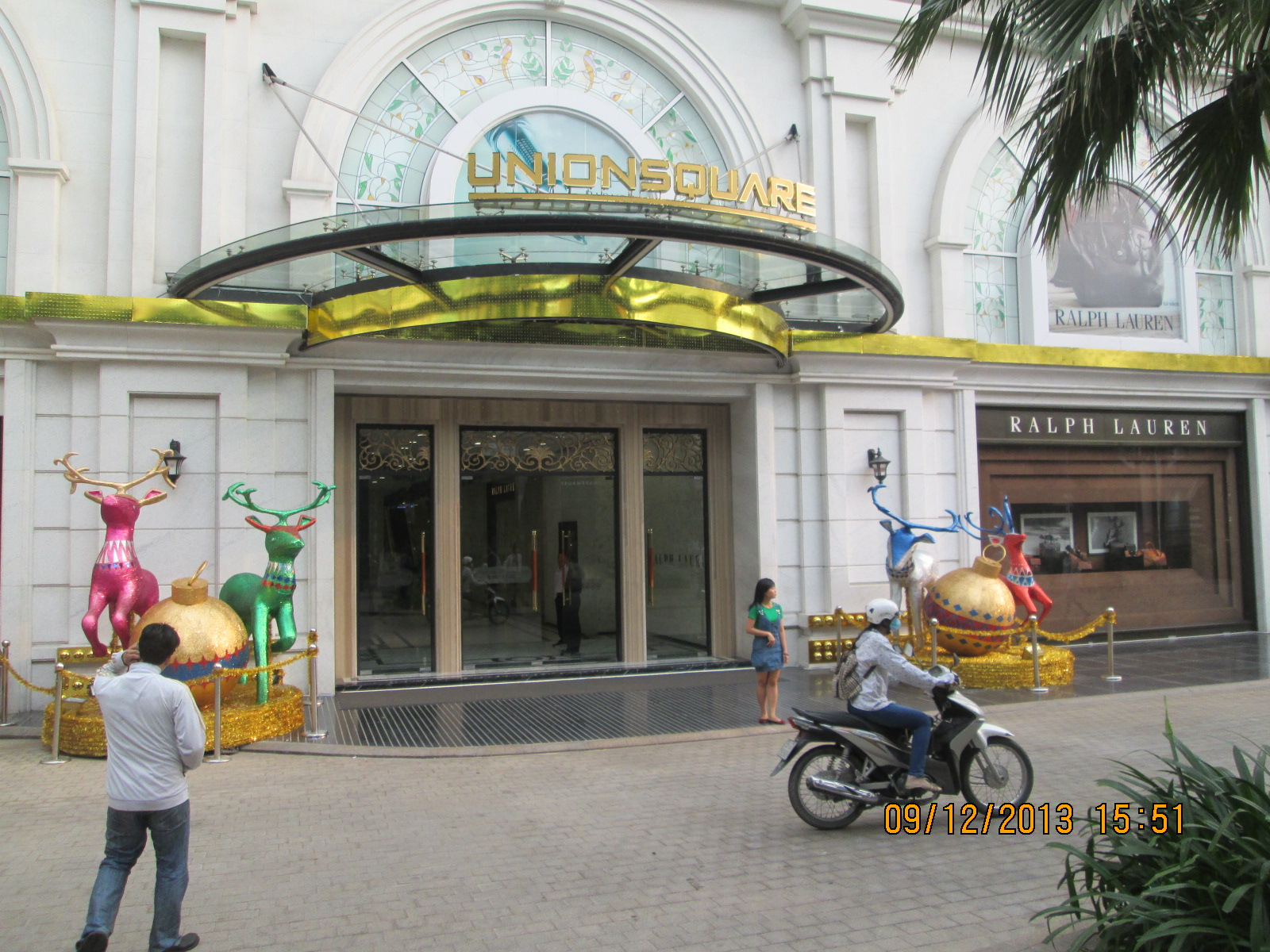
Union Square main gate on Lê Thánh Tôn Street before establishing new logo

== See also ==
- Rex Hotel
- Saigon Centre
- Vincom Center Đồng Khởi
