= Peak Trip with Win Mick =

2024 Thai web series

- Genre: Variety Show; Game Show; Comedy
- Country of origin: Thailand
- Original language: Thai
- No. of episodes: 6

Production
- Production location: Thailand
- Running time: 20 minutes
- Production company: GMMTV

Original release
- Network: YouTube
- Release: 6 August 2024 – present

Peak Trip with Win Mick is a Thai travel-variety web series produced by GMMTV. The show features actor Metawin Opas-iamkajorn (Win) and his younger brother, Metas Opas-iamkajorn (Mick), as they travel to different destinations and take on a series of fun games and challenges. The show premiered on August 6, 2024, and is released irregularly on GMMTV Official YouTube channel.

== Format ==
Each episode follows Win and Mick as they take on various travel experiences and complete game-like challenges at different locations across Thailand. The episodes often include surprise guests, spontaneous missions, and playful punishments for the loser of each challenge. The show highlights their real-life brotherly chemistry, blending comedy, competition, and unscripted moments.

== Hosts ==
- Metawin Opas-iamkajorn (Win)
- Metas Opas-iamkajorn (Mick)

== Episodes ==
Episode	Title	Original Air date	Guest	Ref.
1	Measuring the swing of Win Mick: in this household of pro golfers there's only one true champ!	6 August 2024		
2	Win Mick the drift duo show off their boating skills with a little romance on the side!	20 August 2024		
3	Win Mick Prom ride horses for the first time: will they nail it or fail it?	17 October 2024	Theepakorn Kwanboon (Prom)	
4	Khun Noo In declares war! Win Mick better watch out in this archery match!	31 October 2024	Sarin Ronnakiat (Inn)	
5	Imina help Sky Nani escape the maze!!!	20 January 2025	Hirunkit Changkham (Nani) & Wongravee Nateetorn (Sky)	
6	Hold on until they land! Win Mick vs Sky Nani!	3 February 2025	Hirunkit Changkham (Nani) & Wongravee Nateetorn (Sky)	

== Production ==
Peak Trip with Win Mick is produced by GMMTV and distributed via its official YouTube channel. While there is no regular airing schedule, episodes are promoted in advance through GMMTV's social media and the hosts’ personal platforms.
