= Boys in Love =

2025 Thai television series

- Official series poster
- Thai: เปิดเทอมใหม่ หัวใจหัดรัก
- Genre: Romance; Comedy
- Screenplay by: Waasuthep Ketpetch; Suwanun Pohgudsai; Issaraporn Kuntisuk; Kanokphan Ornrattanasakul
- Directed by: Waasuthep Ketpetch
- Starring: Peemsan Sotangkur; Metas Opas-iamkajorn; Puttipong Jitbut; Ratiphat Luengvoraphan
- Opening theme: "Lesson One" by Barcode Tinnasit
- Composer: Achariya Dulyapaiboon
- Country of origin: Thailand
- Original language: Thai
- No. of episodes: 12

Production
- Executive producers: Sataporn Panichraksapong; Darapa Choeysanguan; Kamthorn Lorjitramnuay; Puchong Tuntisungwaragul; Patha Thongpan
- Producer: Nuttapong Mongkolsawas
- Cinematography: Maneerat Srinakarin
- Running time: 43–53 minutes
- Production companies: GMMTV; Parbdee Taweesuk

Original release
- Network: GMM 25; iQIYI
- Release: 20 April – 6 July 2025

Boys in Love (Thai: เปิดเทอมใหม่ หัวใจหัดรัก; RTGS: Poet Thoem Mai Hua Chai Hat Rak, lit. 'Starting [a] New Term, Heart Learns to Love') is a Thai boys' love television series starring Peemsan Sotangkur (Luke), Metas Opas-iamkajorn (Mick), Puttipong Jitbut (Chokun) and Ratiphat Luengvoraphan (Aston).

Directed by Waasuthep Ketpetch and produced by GMMTV and Parbdee Taweesuk, it was announced during GMMTV Riding the Wave event on 26 November 2024.

The series premiered on GMM 25 on 20 April 2025, airing on Sundays at 20:30 ICT, and was made available for streaming on IQIYI at 21:30 ICT.

== Synopsis ==
A hectic love story of teenagers during the new semester of the 12th grade. Shane (Metas Opas-iamkajorn), an outstanding and very talented student both in terms of study and activities, is reluctantly forced into close proximity with Kit (Peemsan Sotangkur), a classmate who is the opposite to Shane in almost everything. Meanwhile Kim (Puttipong Jitbut) was set on finding a girlfriend before graduating from high school. That was until he met his "true love", Mon (Ratiphat Luengvoraphan), the literature-loving new kid who just joined their class.

== Cast and characters ==
=== Main ===
- Peemsan Sotangkur (Luke) as Korawit Jirawaraphong (Kit)
- Metas Opas-iamkajorn (Mick) as Shinnaphat Methaphan (Shane)
- Puttipong Jitbut (Chokun) as Kimhan Phanurak (Kim)
- Ratiphat Luengvoraphan (Aston) as Rawin Damrongtham (Mon)
- Kanthee Limpitikranon (Ken) as Pawarit Thitibodin (Per)
- Tanan Lohawatanakul (Paul) as Tinnaphop Limwatthanakul (Tar)
- Suphakorn Sriphotong (Pod) as Natdanai Hathaiphan (Nat)
- Phromphiriya Thongputtaruk (Papang) as Thiti Watthanachaikul (Tan)

=== Supporting ===
- Rutricha Phapakithi (Ciize) as Jin
- Napat Patcharachavalit (Aun) as Name
- Wanichaya Pornpanarittichai (Minna) as Cheese

=== Guest ===
- Kriengkrai Fooksaem (Krieng) as Principal Chanchana
- Narin Puwanacharoen (A) as Mr Jirawaraphong
- Chutima Boonkarnchanarat (Ao) as Mrs Jirawaraphong
- Panisara Kulphimokg (Prang) as Kale Jirawaraphong
- Raiwin Chawintanyawat (Boat) as Kan Jirawaraphong
- Sornchai Chatwiriyachai (Chua) as Mr Methaphan
- Yannawee Khuptawetin (Oil) as Mrs Methaphan
- Chalita Fuangaromya (Nan) as Mrs Damrongtham

== Original soundtrack ==
The official soundtrack for Boys in Love features:

Song	Artist(s)	Label	Ref.
"Lesson One"	Barcode Tinnasit	GMMTV Records	
"เติมเต็ม (Missing Piece)"	Luke Peemsan and Mick Metas	GMMTV Records	
"ฮ็อป ฮ็อป ฮ็อป (Stop Clock)"	Chokun Puttipong and Aston Ratiphat	GMMTV Records	
