= Metas Opas-iamkajorn =

Thai actor (born 2006)

- เมธัส โอภาสเอี่ยมขจร
- Born: 17 February 2006 (age 20); Bangkok, Thailand
- Other name: Mick (มิค)
- Education: Thammasat University
- Occupation: Actor
- Years active: 2022–present
- Agent: GMMTV
- Known for: Shane in Boys in Love; Pat in Diva Deva Mata; Ji in Good Boy
- Height: 1.74 m (5 ft 9 in)
- Relatives: Metawin Opas-iamkajorn (older brother)

Metas Opas-iamkajorn (Thai: เมธัส โอภาสเอี่ยมขจร; born 17 February 2006), nicknamed Mick (Thai: มิค), is a Thai actor known for his roles in Boys in Love (2025), MuTeLuv: Diva Deva Mata (2025) and Good Boy (2026).

== Early life and education ==
Metas was born in Bangkok, Thailand, and is the youngest of four siblings. He has two older sisters, Mintra and Mesa, and an older brother, Metawin.

After he graduated from Chulalongkorn University Demonstration School, he went to study abroad in Canada for ten months in an exchange-student programme. Currently, he is studying a 5-year bachelor's-master's program in Accounting and Business Administration (IBMP) at the Faculty of Commerce and Accountancy at Thammasat University. He is also studying law at the same time.

== Career ==
At the age of 15, Metas signed a contact with GMMTV, his first acting credit within the company originally being the television drama You Fight, and I Love announced at the GMMTV Borderless event in December 2021. However, when it was announced the series was to be cancelled due to scheduling conflicts, his debut first role came from the Memory of Happiness segment of the television drama Good Old Days. He was also invited to participate in Beauty Newbie as the younger version of his older brother's character.

His breakthrough role came in 2025 with Boys in Love when he entered the boys' love industry alongside acting partner Peemsan Sotangkur (Luke), a partnership that has continued with their second series together, Good Boy (2026), and the upcoming queer television drama I Wanna Hold Your Hand.

== Filmography ==
=== Television series ===
| Year | Title | Role | Network | Notes | Ref. |
|---|---|---|---|---|---|
| 2022 | Good Old Days: Memory of Happiness | Pete | GMM 25 | Supporting role | |
| 2024 | Beauty Newbie | "Guy" Karin Sayapisit (young) | GMM 25 | Guest role | |
| 2025 | Boys in Love | "Shane" Shinnaphat Methaphan | GMM 25 | Main role | |
| 2025 | MuTeLuv: Diva Deva Mata | Pat | GMM 25 | Supporting role | |
| 2026 | Good Boy | "Ji" Jiraphat Jaroenwong | GMM 25 | Main role | |
| TBA | I Wanna Hold Your Hand † | Thun (young) | TBA | Supporting role | |

=== Television show ===
| Year | Title | Notes | Ref. |
|---|---|---|---|
| 2021 | Arm Share | Ep. 83 | |
| 2024 | Peak Trip with Win Mick (Note: Currently ongoing.) | Main host | |

=== Music video appearances ===
| Year | Title | Artist | Album | Label | Ref. |
|---|---|---|---|---|---|
| 2025 | "Lesson One" | Barcode Tinnasit | Boys in Love OST | GMMTV Records | |

== Discography ==
=== Singles ===
==== Soundtrack appearances ====
| Year | Title | Soundtrack | Label | Ref. |
|---|---|---|---|---|
| 2025 | "เติมเต็ม (Missing Piece)" with Luke Peemsan | Boys in Love OST | GMMTV Records | |
| 2026 | "รักเลยตอนนี้ (Love Day)" with Luke Peemsan | Good Boy OST | GMMTV Records | |
| 2026 | "อยากจดจำใครสักคน (Last Memory)" | Good Boy OST | GMMTV Records | |

== Fan meetings ==
| Title | Date | Venue | Notes | Ref. |
|---|---|---|---|---|
| Boys in Love Final Ep. Fan Meeting | 6 July 2025 | Siam Pavalai Royal Grand Theater, Siam Paragon | With Boys in Love cast | |
| GMMTV Fan Day 26 in Vietnam | 23 November 2025 | Ben Thanh Theatre, Ho Chi Minh City | With Boys in Love cast | |
| Naiin Book Fair 2026 | 28 January 2026 | Samyan Mitrtown, 5th Fl. | With Luke | |
| GMMTV Fanival 2026 | 3 April 2026 | CentralWorld Pulse, 7th Fl. | With Luke | |
| Good Boy: The First Restart | 11 October 2026 (Note: Originally scheduled for 4 October 2026; postponed due to mass flooding in Bangkok) | Siam Pavalai Royal Grand Theater, Siam Paragon | With Good Boy cast | |
| GMMTV Fanival: Happy Family | 13 October 2026 | Union Hall, Union Mall | With Luke | |

== Concerts ==
| Year | Title | Date(s) | Venue | Ref. |
|---|---|---|---|---|
| 2025 | GMMTV Starlympics 2025 | 20 December 2025 | Impact Arena, Muang Thong Thani | |
