= Good Boy (Thai TV series) =

2026 Thai television series

- Official series poster
- Thai: จิรภัทรจะเป็นเด็กดี
- Genre: Romance; Boys' love
- Based on: Jiraphat Will Be a Good Boy (จิรภัทรจะเป็นเด็กดี) by cyn.d.r
- Directed by: Siwaj Sawatmaneekul
- Starring: Peemsan Sotangkur; Metas Opas-iamkajorn
- Opening theme: "รักเลยตอนนี้ (Love Day)" by Luke Peemsan and Mick Metas
- Ending theme: "รักเลยตอนนี้ (Love Day)" by Luke Peemsan and Mick Metas (Ep. 1–2) "ความหวังที่สอง (Rehope)" by Luke Peemsan (Ep. 3–5) "อยากจดจำใครสักคน (Last Memory)" by Mick Metas (Ep. 6–7)
- Composer: Pure Kanin
- Country of origin: Thailand
- Original language: Thai
- No. of episodes: 10

Production
- Executive producers: Sataporn Panichraksapong; Darapa Choeysanguan
- Producers: Nuttapong Mongkolsawas; Supaporn Lertthitiverakarn
- Cinematography: Panpode Boonprasert; Saran Jantharakkha
- Running time: 43–47 minutes
- Production companies: GMMTV; Studio Wabi Sabi

Original release
- Release: 11 October 2026 – present

Good Boy (Thai: จิรภัทรจะเป็นเด็กดี; RTGS: Chiraphat Cha Pen Dek Di, lit. 'Jiraphat Will Be a Good Boy') is a 2026 Thai boys' love television series starring Peemsan Sotangkur (Luke) and Metas Opas-iamkajorn (Mick), adapted from the web novel Jiraphat Will Be a Good Boy by cyn.d.r.

Directed by Siwaj Sawatmaneekul and produced by GMMTV and Studio Wabi Sabi, it was announced on 25 November 2025, during the GMMTV Magic Vibes Maximized event.

The series premiered on GMM 25 on 11 October 2026, airing on Sundays at 20:30 ICT. It was made available for streaming at 21:30 ICT on Viu.

== Synopsis ==
Jiraphat (Thitipoom Techaapaikhun), passes away at 30 years old with regrets. Receiving the opportunity to come back to start a new life at the age of 17 again, Ji (Metas Opas-iamkajorn) intends to use this second opportunity to change his life and live better than before. This return to his teenage years reunites him with Ruth (Peemsan Sotangkur), the student president and his childhood friend he had forgotten. As their relationship gradually becomes closer, Ji realises his second life is not only a chance to fix his past, but also an opportunity to get to know someone he never meant to let go of in his future.

== Cast and characters ==
=== Main ===
- Peemsan Sotangkur (Luke) as Atiwitch Rattanawatthana (Ruth) / Theeraruth Rattanawatthana (Thee)
  - Tawan Vihokratana (Tay) as adult Ruth (Note: As guest role)
- Metas Opas-iamkajorn (Mick) as Jiraphat Jaroenwong (Ji)
  - Thitipoom Techaapaikhun (New) as adult Ji (Note: As guest role)

=== Supporting ===
- Tarnpol Pongnarisorn (Tata) as Tyler Hendricks
  - Prachaya Ruangroj (Singto) as adult Tyler (Note: As guest role)
- Ing Asavanund as Kongphop Saetang (Kong)
- Jeeratch Wongpian (Fluke) as Tinnapob (Tin)
- Samantha Melanie Coates (Sammy) as Mai
- Juthapich Indrajundra (Jamie) as Jitrada Jaroenwong (Jean)
- Chayakorn Jutamas (JJ) as Gun Loetrattanaphanit
- Kridchayaan Attavipach (Prom) as Tontawan (Tawan)
- Itchayada Vibhupipat (Earn) as Ployphailin (Ploy)
- Nichapa Praepeerakul (Mymé) as Lalita (Lita)
- Thamonchita Namkool (Mantra) as Phappim Thanasansamrit (Pim)
- Ratapirom Bandapraneat (Michiru) as Kessarin Thiratraiphusit (Ket)
- Srisirin Vichayasut (Artist) as Khwan
- Matas Bayseng (Geno) as Thiti
- Supakorn Kantanit (Guitar) as Min
- Phichayada Chonpaipimolrut (Pang) as Irin Rattanawatthana (Peach)
- Jirawat Vachirasarunpatra (War) as Mr. Narong
- Phollawat Manuprasert (Tom) as Jira Jaroenwong (Ji and Jean's father)
- Nipawan Taveepornsawan (Kai) as Narumon Jaroenwong (Mon) (Ji and Jean's mother)
- Sarut Vichitrananda (Big) as Diruth Rattanawatthana (Ruth's father)
- Thansita Suwatcharathanakit (Chompu) as Ornrampha Rattanawatthana (Ruth's mother)

== Original soundtrack ==
The official soundtrack for Good Boy features:

Song	Artist(s)	Label	Ref.
"รักเลยตอนนี้ (Love Day)"	Luke Peemsan and Mick Metas	GMMTV Records	
"ความหวังที่สอง (Rehope)"	Luke Peemsan	GMMTV Records	
"อยากจดจำใครสักคน (Last Memory)"	Mick Metas	GMMTV Records	
