= Thạnh Mỹ Tây =

Thạnh Mỹ Tây may refer to several places in Vietnam:

- Thạnh Mỹ Tây, Ho Chi Minh City: a ward in the former Bình Thạnh district
- Thạnh Mỹ Tây, An Giang: a commune in the former Châu Phú district
