= Bến Thành Theatre =

Theatre in Ho Chi Minh City, Vietnam

- Nhà hát Bến Thành
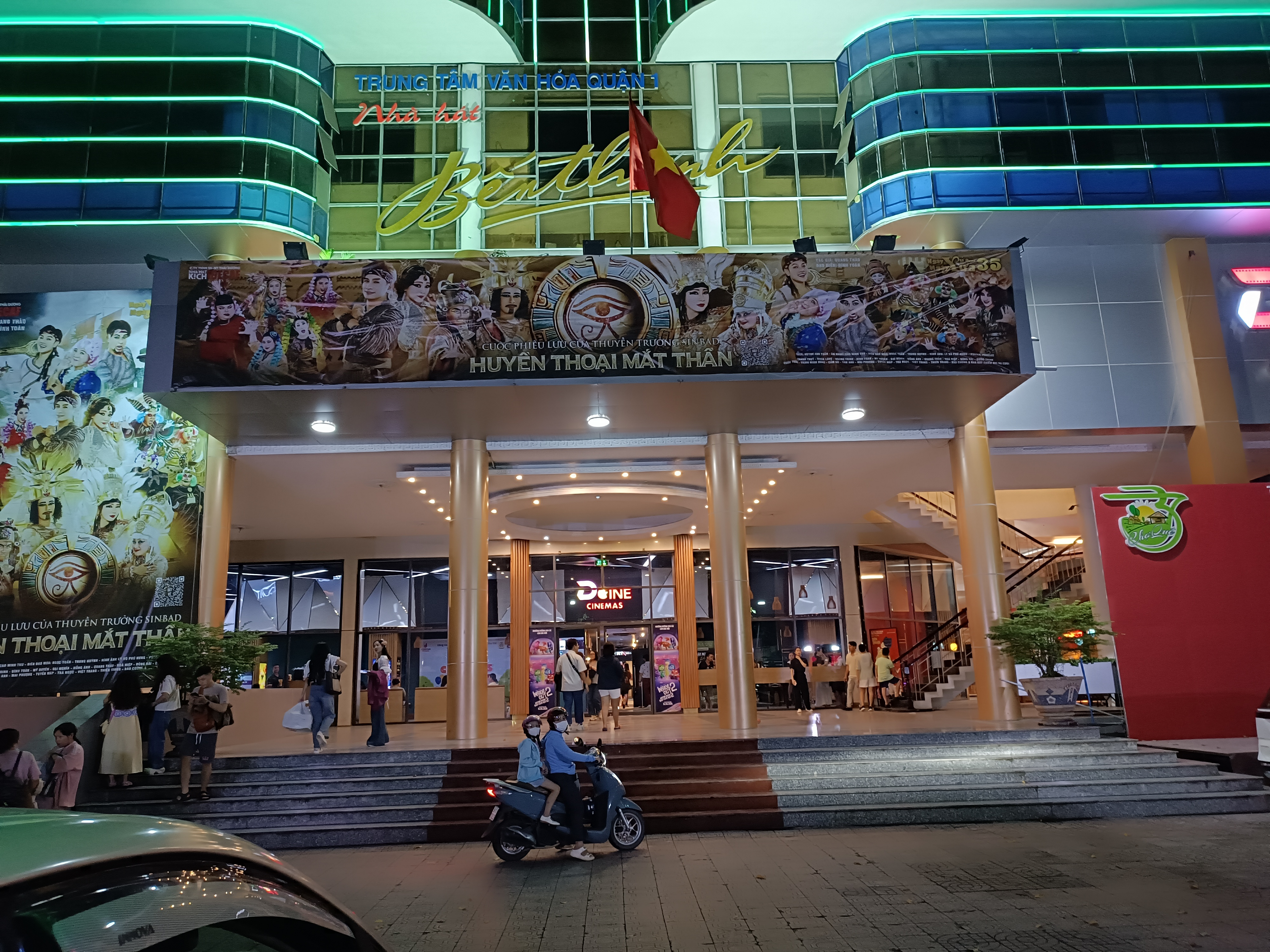
- Facade of Bến Thành Theatre in 2024

General information
- Type: Theatre, music lounge, cinema
- Location: No. 6 Mạc Đĩnh Chi, Saigon, Ho Chi Minh City, Vietnam
- Coordinates: 10°47′03″N 106°42′03″E
- Opened: 1998

Other information
- Seating type: Cushion
- Seating capacity: 1040 (Multi-purpose Hall is 150)
- Public transit: L1 Ba Son station; L3 Hoa Lư station (proposed)

Website
- nhahatbenthanh.vn

Bến Thành Theatre (Vietnamese: Nhà hát Bến Thành) is a theatre for performing arts inside a building that technically known as District 1 Cultural Center, now is Saigon Ward Public Service Center. Located at No. 6 Mạc Đĩnh Chi Street, Bến Nghé ward, District 1, Ho Chi Minh City (now is Saigon ward), the theatre was built to serve the performance needs of a district-level cultural center. It is one of the major theatres in the municipality, alongside with the Hòa Bình Theater and Saigon Opera House.

== Usage ==
=== Theatre ===
There are two rooms, the 1040-people room is used for performing arts (concert, musical theatre, etc) and can be used for fan meeting. While the 150-people room is usually used for press conferences, conventions, mini shows or open stage. The theatre is located at the 1stFloor.

=== Cinema ===
The DCine Bến Thành Cinema, opened in 2019 with 5 rooms and about 500 seats. The cinema is located at the Ground Floor.

=== Music Lounge ===
The Bến Thành Lounge (Vietnamese: Phòng trà Bến Thành) is located at the 3rd Floor with about 300 seat. The lounge is where so many well-known Vietnamese singers have performed, such as Cẩm Ly, Quốc Thiên, Văn Mai Hương, etc.
