= Hồ Văn Nhựt =

Founder of the Red Cross in South Vietnam

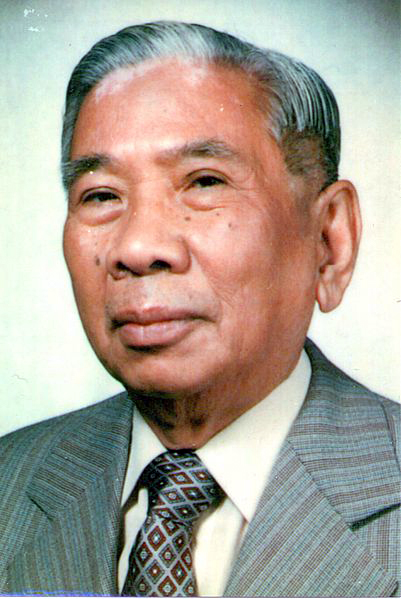
- Born: 15 July 1905; Tân Qui Đông, Sa Đéc, French Cochinchina
- Died: 13 March 1986 (aged 80); Paris, France
- Occupation: Medical doctor
- Known for: Founder of Southern Red Cross of Vietnam and Opposition leader
- Spouse: Trương Hồng Hoa (10 November 1921 – 8 March 2002)

Hồ Văn Nhựt (Note: In this Vietnamese name, the surname is Hồ, but is often simplified to Ho in English-language text. In accordance with Vietnamese custom, this person should be referred to by the given name, Nhựt.) (15 July 1905 – 13 March 1986) was a medical doctor who founded the Southern branch of Red Cross of Vietnam and a South Vietnamese opposition leader during and after the period of resistance against colonialism.

== Childhood and education ==
Nhựt was born on 15 July 1905 in the village of Tân Qui Đông, Sa Đéc province, to a traditional family of scholars and mandarins (nho giáo) in the Southern part of Vietnam, which was then a French colony known as 'French Cochinchina.’

He obtained his father's permission to travel to Saigon to study at the French-founded Collège Chasseloup-Laubat in the section for Vietnamese children or "quartier indigène." Among his school friends was the scholar and historian Hồng Sển Vương. Some time later, as a mid-teenager, Nhựt travelled to France to further his studies. The purpose of Nhựt's study in France was to help him acquire the necessary Western knowledge that would allow him to serve his country upon his return to Vietnam.

== Medical training and return to Vietnam ==
Nhựt obtained his brevet and baccalauréat in Montpellier, where he also started his medical training which was completed in Paris in 1933. His thesis supervised by Professor Louis-Jacques Tanon (1876–1969), an eminent expert in hygiene and tropical medicine, was dedicated to the study of malaria and approaches to controlling this disease in Saigon.

Nhựt then chose to specialize in gynaecology & obstetrics at the Maternité Baudelocque under Professor Alexandre Couvelaire (1873–1948), a prominent specialist in this field. He practised medicine in France for some time to gain further experience before returning to Vietnam in 1938 where he founded the first South Vietnamese maternity clinic in Phú Nhuận on the outskirts of Saigon. He later became Director of the national maternity hospital Từ Dũ (bệnh viện Từ Dũ) in Saigon.

Outside of his professional career, Nhựt participated in the national movement to popularize the press written in modern-day Vietnamese or Quốc ngữ in Cochinchina. With his friend and colleague Hồ Tá Khanh, he founded the weekly newspaper Văn Lang in Saigon in 1939, which had the support and contributions from South-Vietnamese intellectuals trained in France.

== Humanitarian acts and work for the Red Cross ==
Nhựt's humanitarian work is remembered for the support he gave to those in difficulty during one of the most troubled times of Vietnamese history. He was personally involved in helping his fellow countrymen who were persecuted because of their anti-colonial activities and, as an example, secretly took care of the wife and children of the revolutionary Nguyen An Ninh after Ninh's arrest by the colonial authorities leading to his death in prison. In a wider context, Dr Nhựt's humanitarian efforts are remembered through his work for the Red Cross.

In 1951, Nhựt founded the Southern branch of Red Cross of Vietnam, which was officially recognized by the International Committee of the Red Cross, to address the increasing needs for assistance to Vietnamese civilians caught in the conflict during the Indochina War and to those affected by natural disasters. The official name of the organization was Vietnamese Red Cross (VRC), with its headquarters at an avenue in central Saigon named after the organization (Hồng Thập Tự or Vietnamese for Red Cross; currently Nguyễn Thị Minh Khai).

During his time as President of the VRC, Nhựt, with the help from his friends, raised money to build the VRC's headquarters. He also established the first nursing school, the first rescue training courses, and the first community care centres of South Vietnam among many other projects. By July 1953, 15 doctors were working in rotation benevolently in the first two care centres, which were opened 7 days a week to provide treatment to 600 patients daily. In the same year, the VRC managed to organize nine convoys, seven by road and two by air, offering help to 50,000 people across South Vietnam. Each road convoy carried around 100 VRC personnel, including 45 nurses and 30 rescuers; the air convoys were less loaded and were made possible with the help of Mr Phạm Hòe, managing director of COSARA, the first privately owned Vietnamese airline.

The VRC played an important role in the program of aid to the million refugees from North to South Vietnam, following the Geneva Agreements in 1954.

Nhựt was appointed Commander of the National Order of Vietnam (Bảo Quốc Huân Chương) for his contribution and dedication to the VRC.

== South Vietnamese opposition leader ==
Nhựt was a South Vietnamese opposition leader known for his reluctance to co-operate with governments backed by foreign influence. He was invited to take part or to form his own cabinet in successive South Vietnamese régimes, but declined to take part in any government during or after French administration of Indochina. Instead, as remembered by a prominent Vietnamese historian and writer, "like others of the ivy league of South Vietnamese patriots such as Lưu Văn Lang, Dương Minh Thới, Phạm Văn Lạng, Thượng Công Thuận, Nguyễn Xuân Bái, the doctor was always ready to participate in nationalistic movements demanding for peace and independence" for his country.

In 1945, Nhựt was Committee member and Head of Propaganda of the Thanh Niên Tiền Phong (the Vanguard Youth), a major South Vietnamese patriotic and humanitarian coalition, which later joined the Việt Minh and embarked on the August Revolution against colonial rule.

In 1947 in support of the appeal by the Vietnamese Government of Resistance to France, he voluntarily signed the Manifesto of the Intellectuals of Saigon-Cholon (Manifeste des Intellectuels de Saigon–Cholon or Tuyên Ngôn của Trí Thức Sài Gòn-Chợ Lớn). The manifesto called the French Government to enter negotiations in order to end the devastating conflict in Indochina. The signatories deemed that Vietnam, a nation with a long history, deserved its rights to freedom and independence, and that the longer the conflict lasted, the more damaging it would be to the good relationship between France and Vietnam.

Several times, he refused to have an audience with the ex-emperor Bao Dai to discuss his participation in government. In the early 1950s, as President of the Vietnamese Red Cross ("VRC"), Dr Nhựt removed the slogan "Down with the Việt Minh" that Bảo Đại, then Head of the State of Vietnam, had asked be painted above the entrance to the headquarters of the VRC.

After the Geneva Agreements and the partition of Vietnam in 1954, Nhựt was suggested as candidate for the position of Prime Minister of the State of Vietnam, but this proposition did not materialize. Subsequently, under the First Republic of South Vietnam, Nhựt was invited to join the government led by Ngô Đình Diệm. Diệm's brother and chief political advisor, Ngô Đình Nhu, invited Nhựt to several meetings, but Dr Nhựt’s differing political views led him to decline to join the Diệm administration.

In the late 1950s and early 1960s Nhựt’s patriotic activities led to his many imprisonments, notably by Ngô Đình Diệm, and to the arrest of his wife.

In 1964, after the First Republic of South Vietnam collapsed, Nhựt was invited to participate in the High National Council, a civilian advisory body set up by the military junta under pressure from the United States, to prepare the constitution of the Second Republic. Phan Khắc Sửu was appointed Head of State by the Council and he subsequently asked Dr Nhựt to assume the role of Prime Minister. Nhựt initially declined the offer but was persuaded to reconsider it. He, however, wanted to negotiate a solution for national reconciliation and eventually declined the offer after unsatisfactory talks.

During his later years in Saigon, Nhựt dedicated his time to his patients and to those who needed his help until the Vietnam War ended. He and his wife were reunited with their family abroad in his final years.

Nhựt died in Paris, France, on 13 March 1986.
