= Tao Đàn Park =

Urban park in Ho Chi Minh City

Coordinates: 10°46′28″N 106°41′33″E

- Jardin de la Ville
- Công viên Tao Đàn, Vườn Tao Đàn
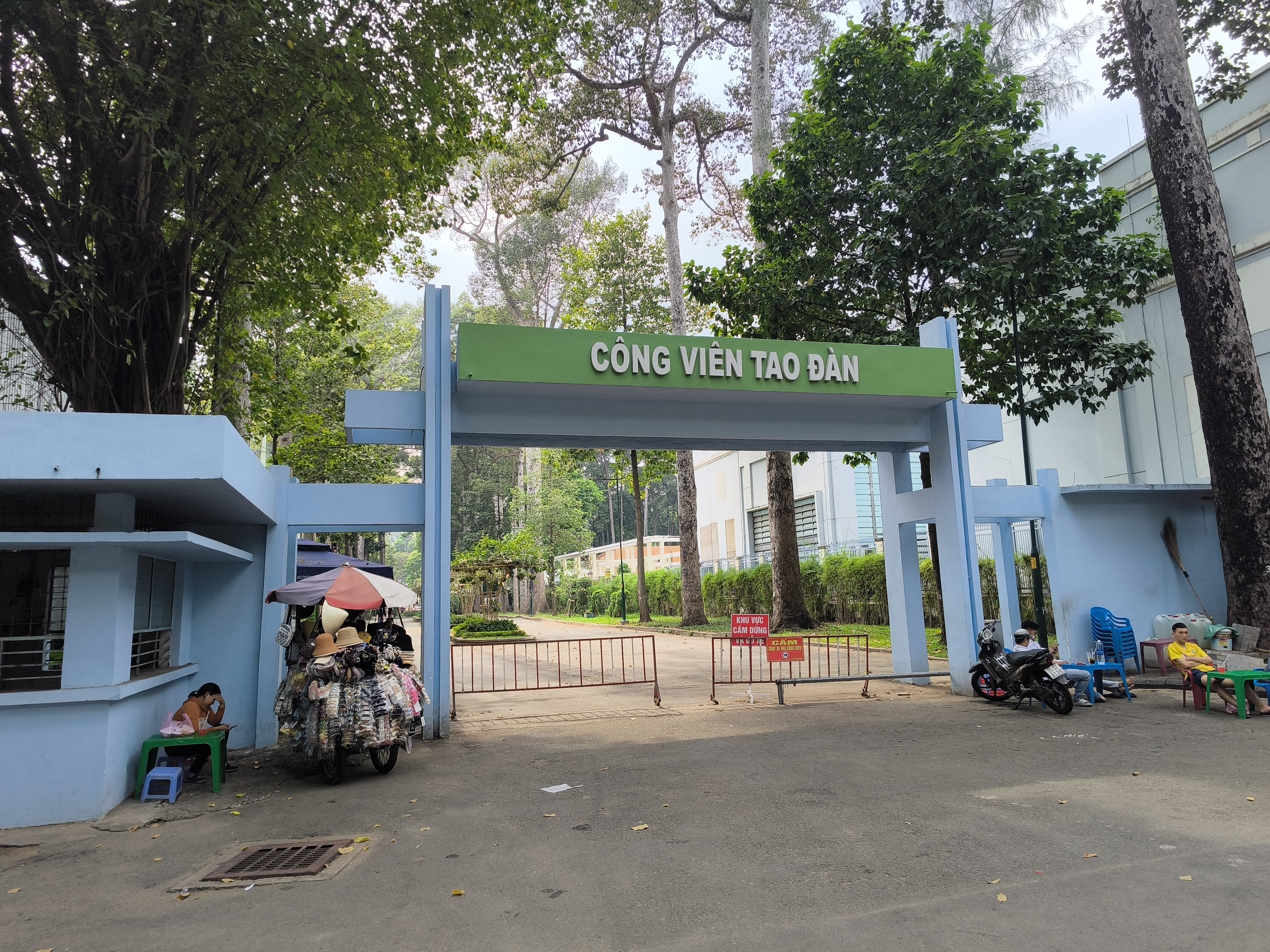
- An entrance gate of the park
- Interactive map of Tao Đàn Park
- Type: Urban Park
- Location: Bến Thành, District 1, Ho Chi Minh City
- Area: 10 hectares (25 acres)
- Public transit: L1 L2 L3 L4 Ben Thanh station (not on Line 3), Tao Đàn station (not on Line 1 and 4)

Tao Đàn Park or fully known as Tao Đàn Cultural Park (Vietnamese: Công viên Tao Đàn, Công viên Văn Hóa Tao Đàn), also known as Tao Đàn Garden (Vườn Tao Đàn) is an urban park in District 1, Ho Chi Minh City, Vietnam behind the Independence Palace with an address 55C Nguyễn Thị Minh Khai, Bến Thành. It is one of the largest parks in the city, covering 10 hectares. Part of the park will be used for the entrance of the underground Ho Chi Minh City Metro's Tao Đàn station for Lines 2 and 3.

== History ==
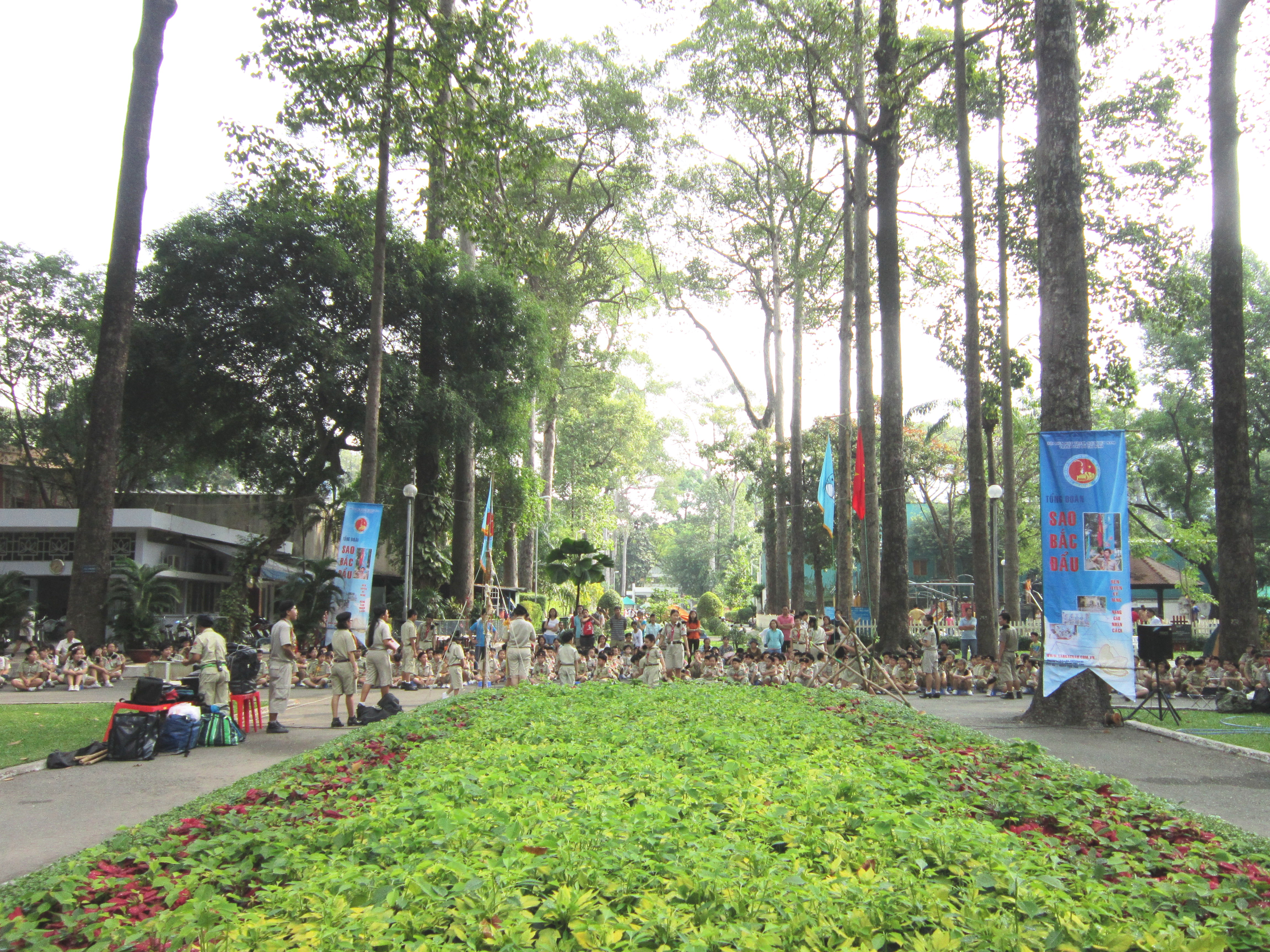
Camp activity for teenagers in Tao Đàn Park

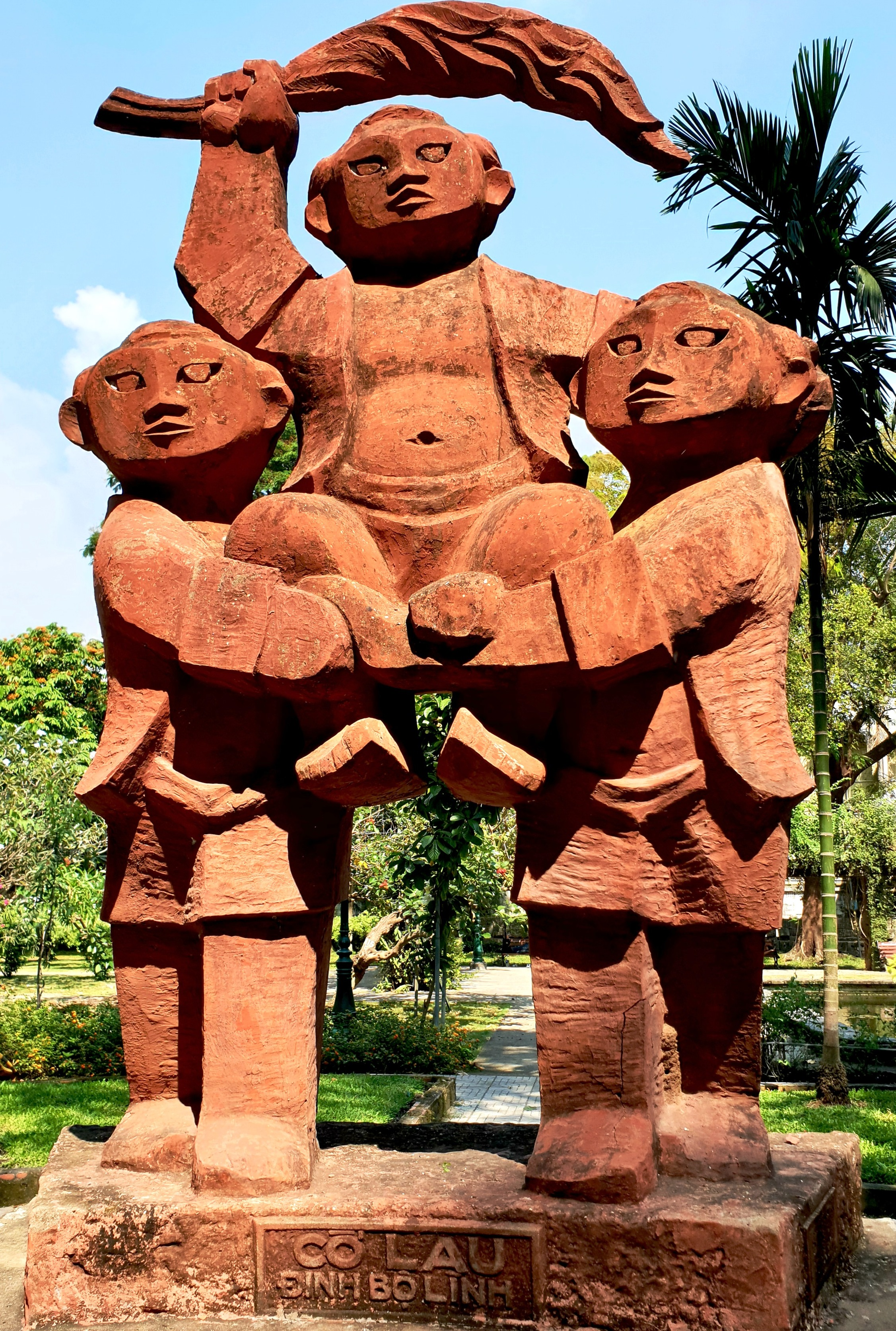
Statue of Đinh Bộ Lĩnh reed flag in Tao Đàn Park

The whole park was the garden of the Saigon Governor's Palace (Dinh Toàn quyền) of France. In 1869, when the French Miss Clavell Street (now is Huyền Trân Công Chúa Street), the left three roads adjacent to the park are rue Chasseloup-Laubat in the north (now is Nguyễn Thị Minh Khai Street), rue Verdun (now is Cách Mạng Tháng Tám Stret) in the west, and rue Taberd in the south (now is Nguyễn Du Street), the Trương Định Street goes through the park was opened after 1957 in the South Vietnam era, it was renamed from rue Admiral Roze and connected with rue Lareyniere (which was named as Đoàn Thị Điểm Street in South Vietnam period and renamed into Trương Định Street after 1975).

After the separation from the palace and renamed Jardin de la Ville (means 'The City Garden'), but the Vietnamese people prefer to called it as Vườn Ông Thượng (as this is the garden in the Governor's Palace and the local people commonly referred to the residences or workplaces of high-ranking officials as "Ông Thượng" or "Quan Thượng") or Vườn Bồ-Rô, maybe it was taken from préau (means the "covered ground" in French).

Trương Định Street, opened in 1957

Next, the city built additional facilities in the garden for the Philharmonic Society (Société philharmonique) in 1896, the Freemasonry (Franc-maçonnerie) in 1897, and the Saigon Sports Circle (Cercle Sportif Saigonnais; now is the Ho Chi Minh City Cultural Palace for Labors) in 1902 including a football pitch, a swimming pool, and tennis court. At the time, that football pitch was the only one that met the standards to host foreign teams. In 1926, at the corner of Chasseloup-Laubat and Verdun streets, the government built an Institute of Childcare (Institut de puériculture) to educate children. After the French Indochina is over in Vietnam, The Governor-General's Palace became the Presidential Palace (Independence Palace), and the garden was renamed Tao Đàn Garden (Vườn Tao Đàn). The four surrounding streets were also renamed Huyền Trân Công Chúa Street, Hồng Thập Tự Street (means 'Red Cross'), Lê Văn Duyệt Street, and Nguyễn Du Street in the South Vietnam time. The Institute of Childcare (Viện Dục Nhi) was used as the Ministry of Health of the Republic of Vietnam era and now is the Ho Chi Minh City Department of Health. The garden remains the central park of the city.

=== After the Reunification Day ===
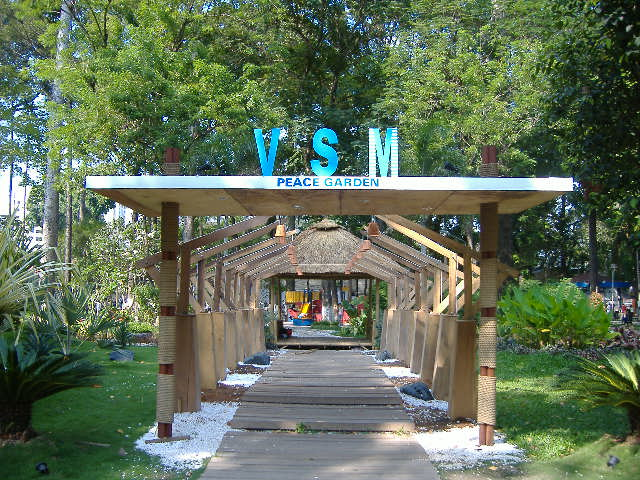
A miniature landscape in the park

Tao Đàn Garden was renamed as "Công viên Văn hoá Tao Đàn" ('Tao Đàn Cultural Park'), and have a distinct kids playground area. Saigon Sports Club also renamed as Câu lạc bộ Văn hóa 'Cultural Club'), with some kiosk and the Ho Chi Minh City Cultural Palace for Labors. Food Company Saigon (or Ho Chi Minh City, shortened as FOODCOSA) headquarter was here at 57 Nguyễn Thị Minh Khai but now has relocated to Bình Tiên (District 6, Ho Chi Minh City). However, the garden is still known for its abundance of greenery. The remaining park is where Spring Flowers Festival in Tao Đàn Park (Hội Hoa Xuân) are held every year before the Tết. Currently, a parking lot and shopping center project is underway beneath the park, invested in by a domestic company. In 1992, the Hùng king Memorial Temple was built within the park and was first renovated in 2011.

== Gallery ==
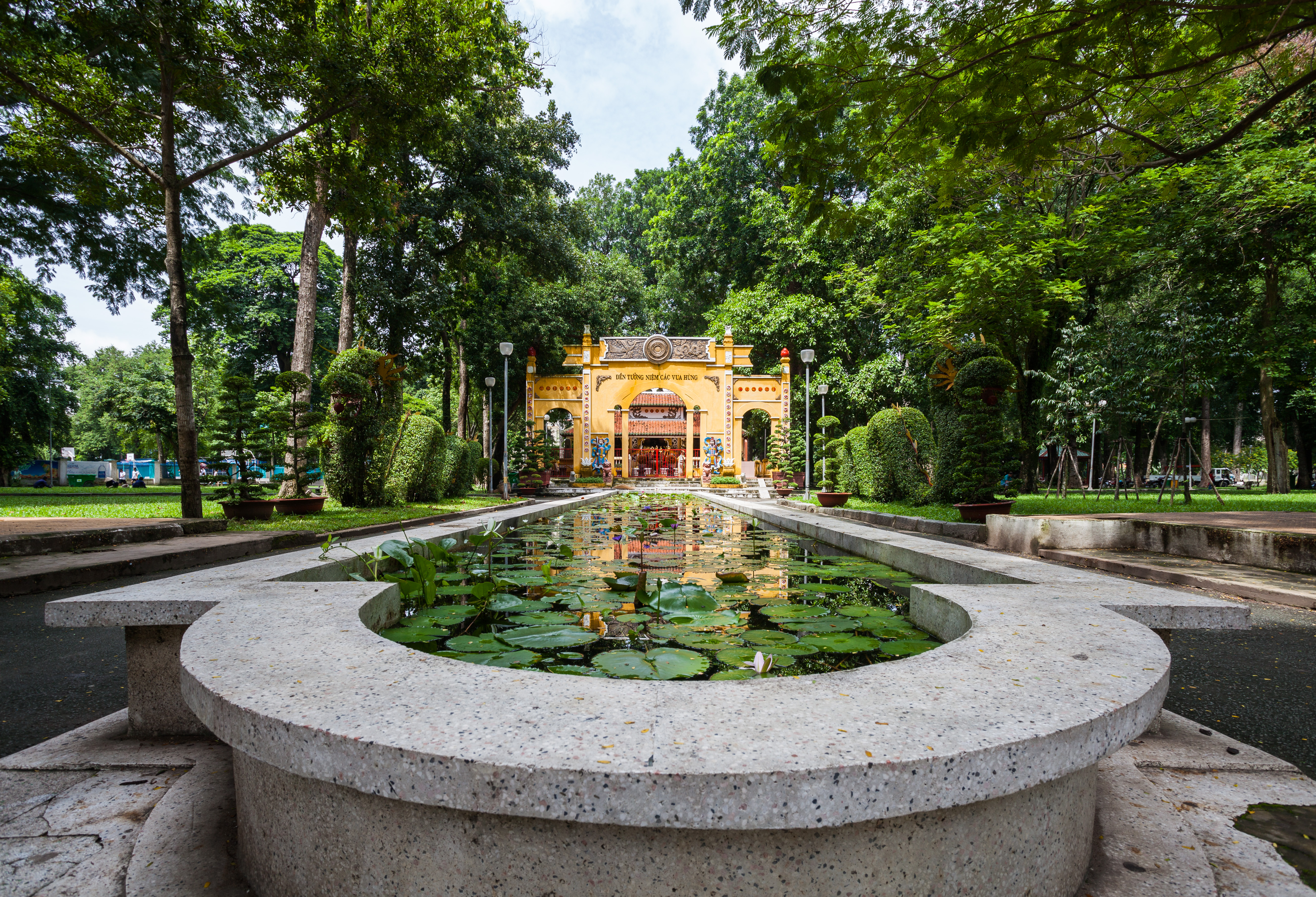

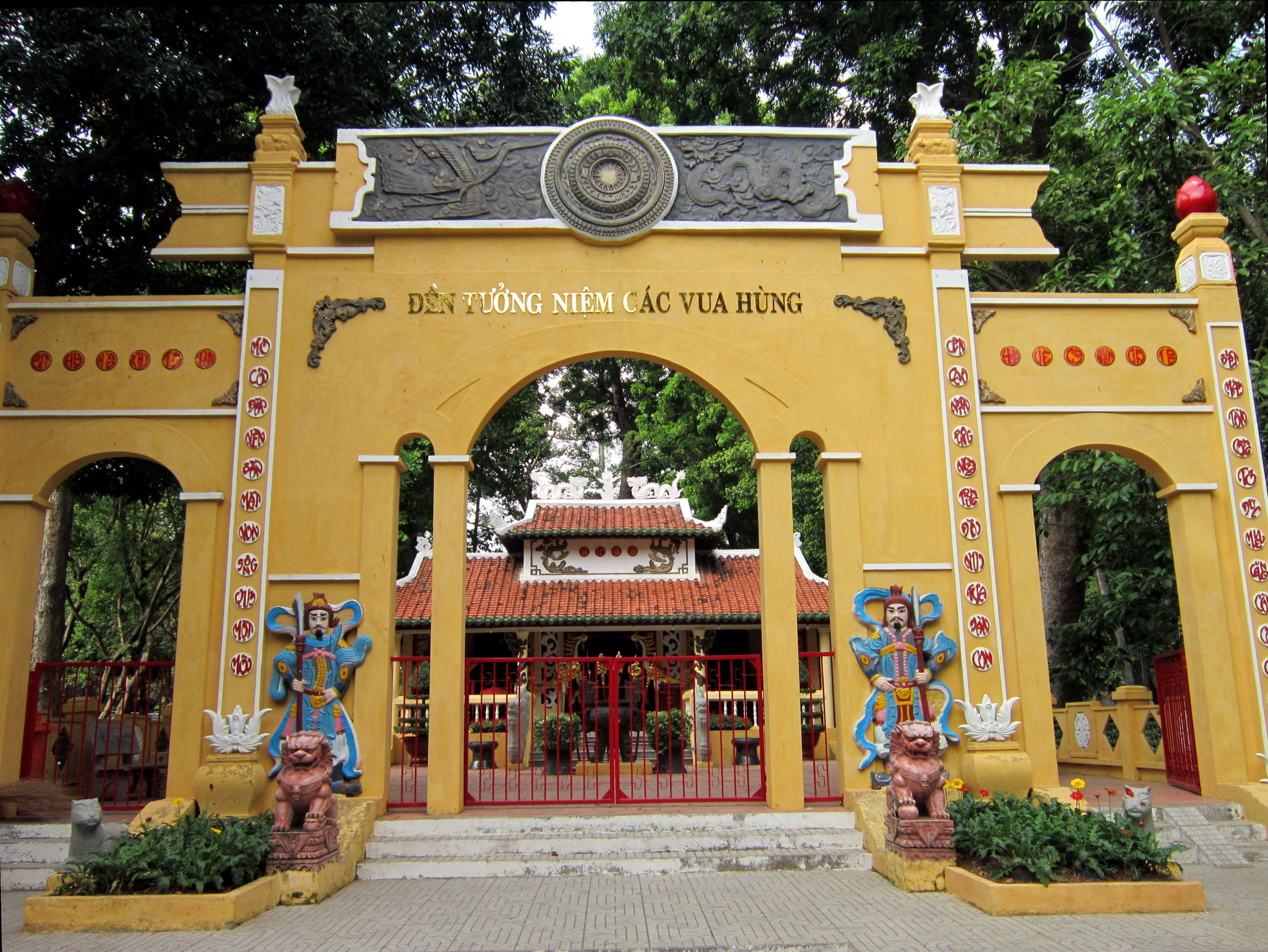
Hùng king Memorial Temple.

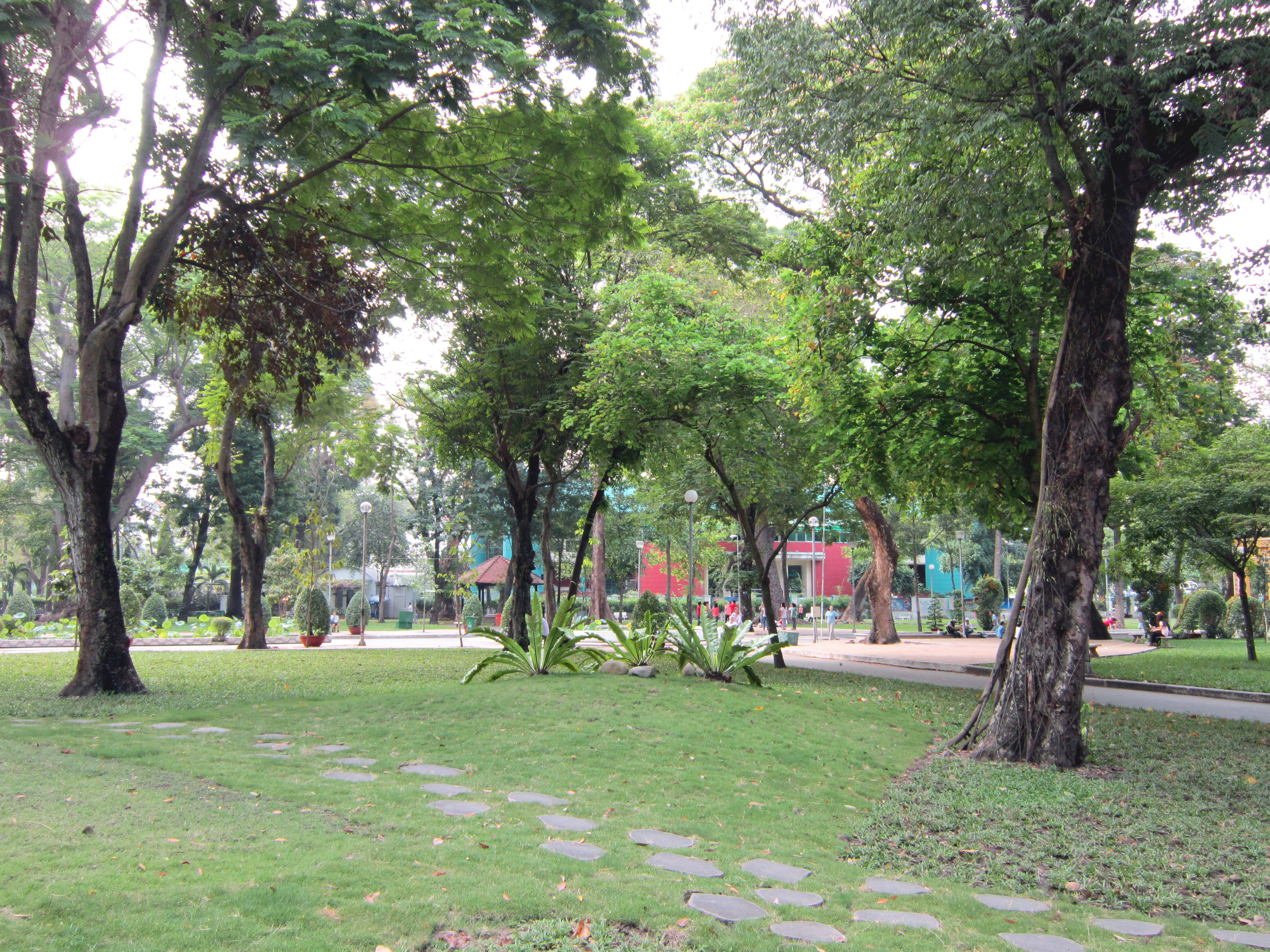

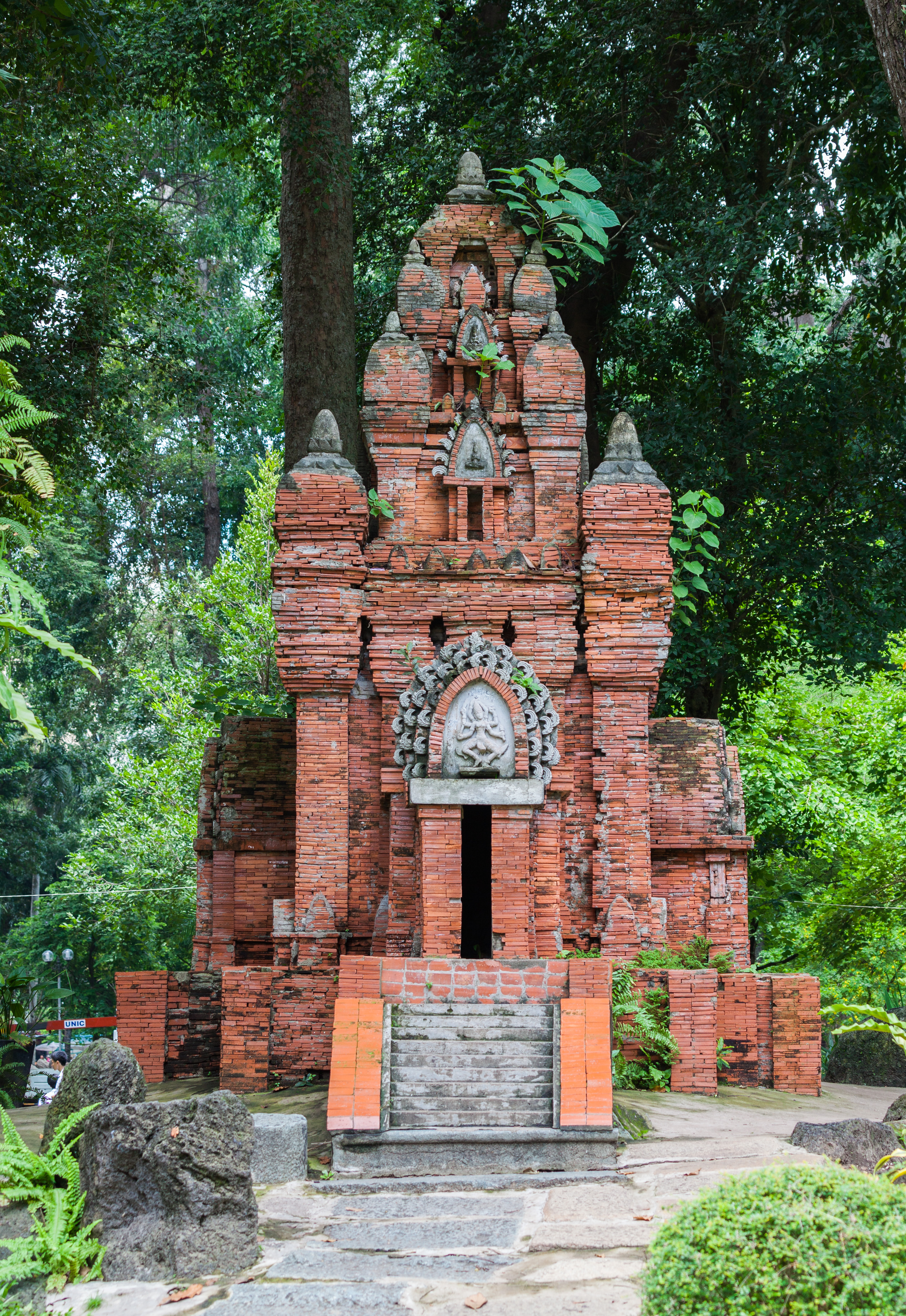

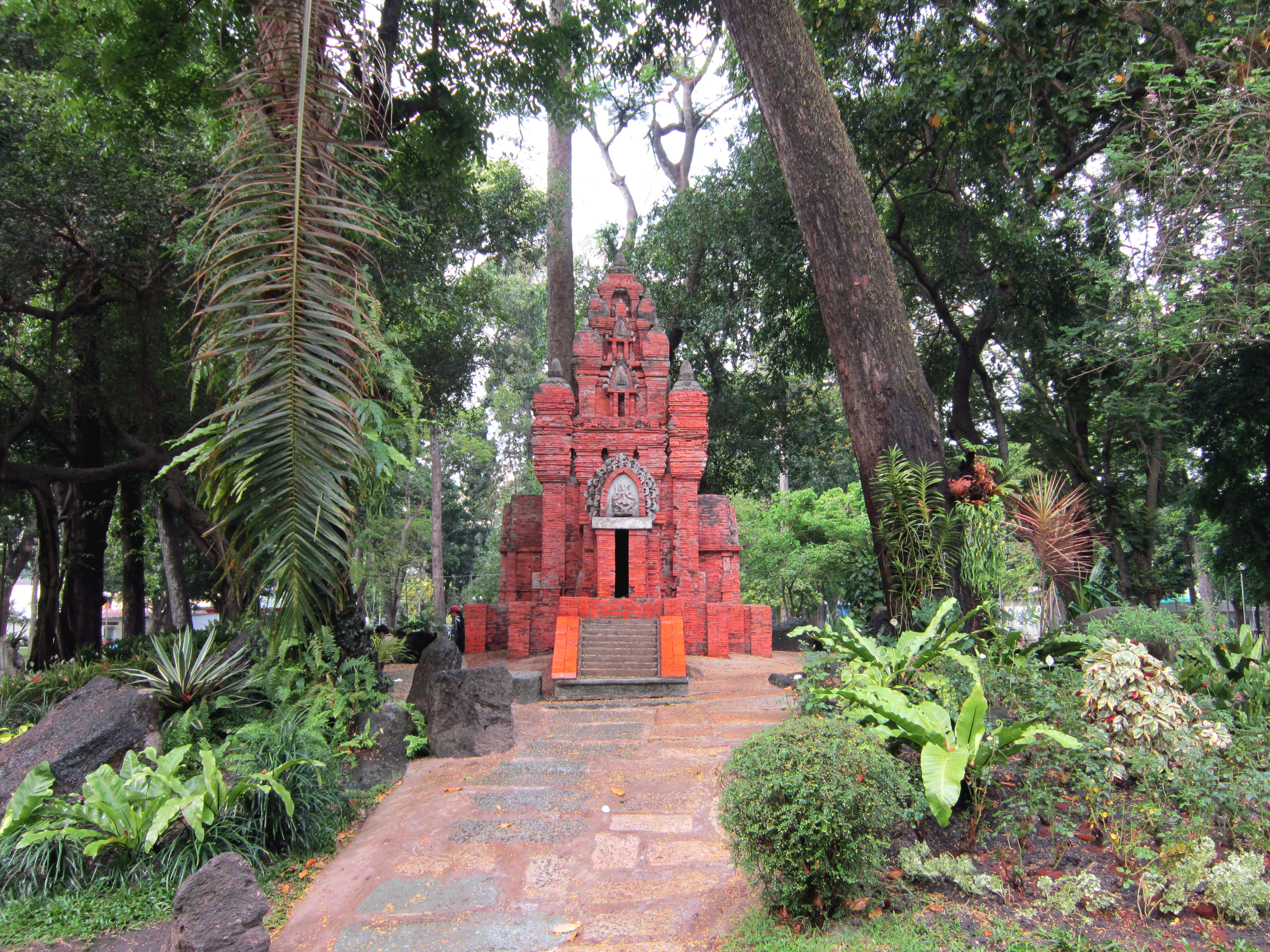
A small Champa Temple in the park

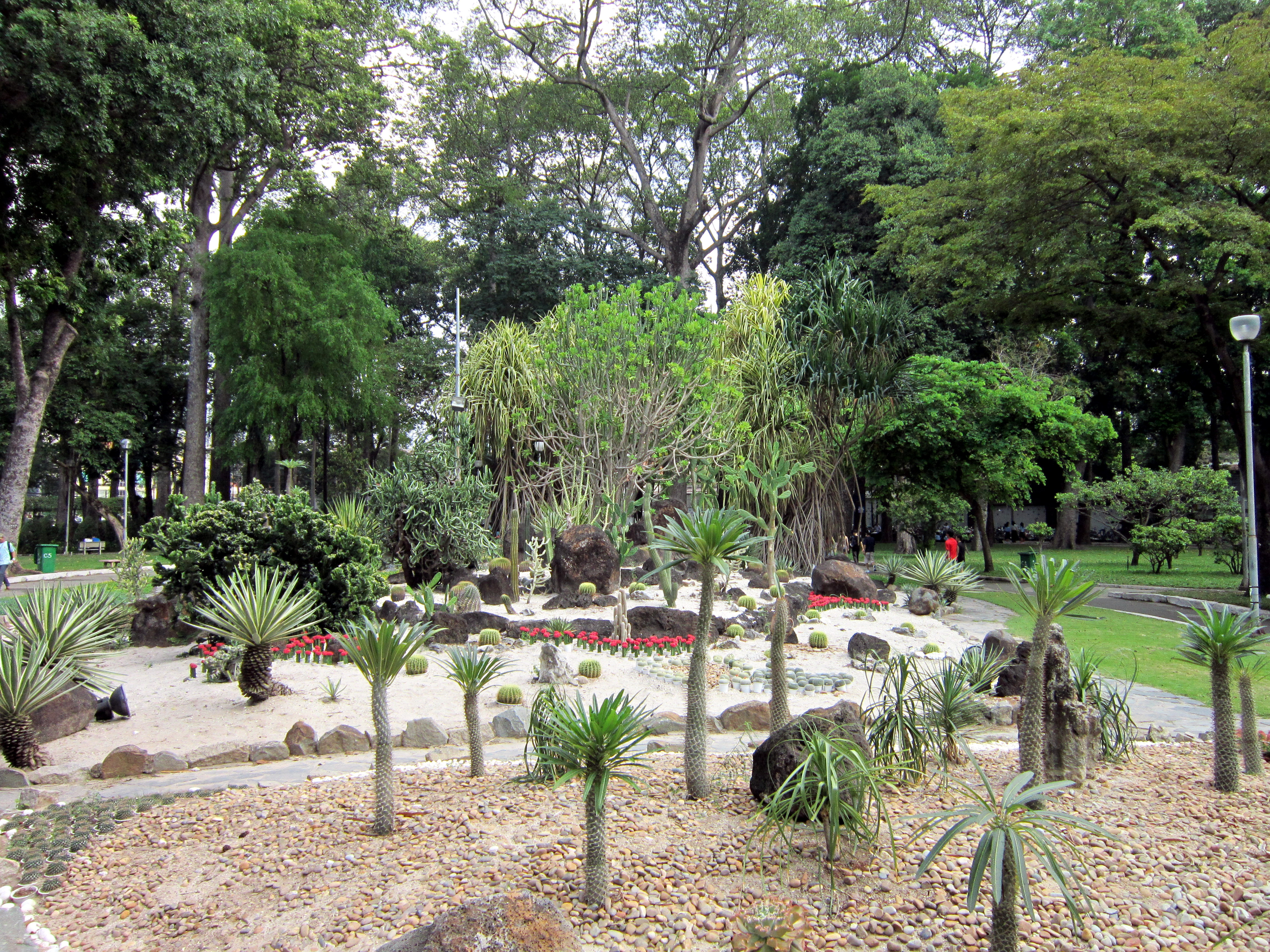
Cactus

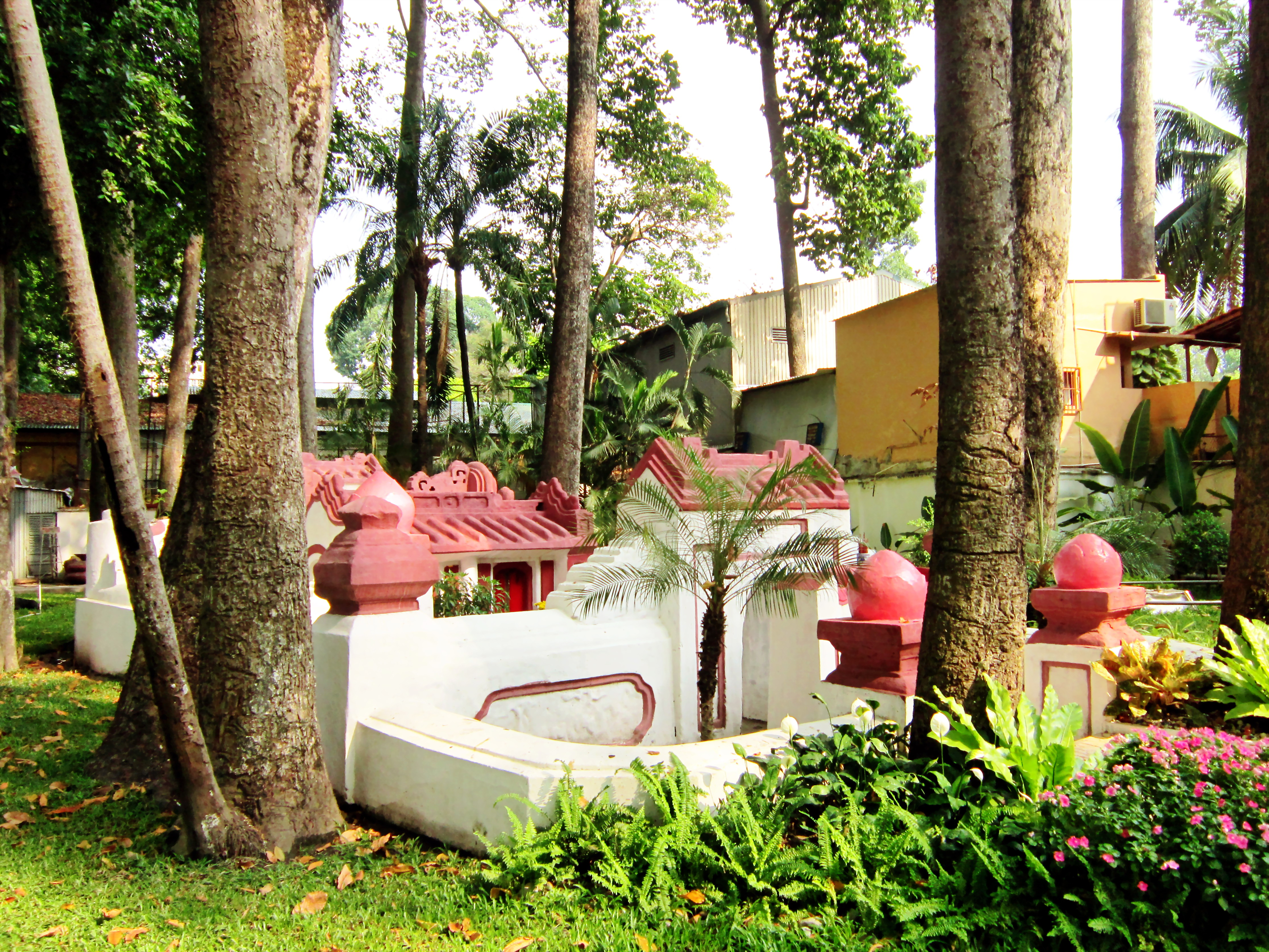
An ancient mausoleum has been officially recognized by the city

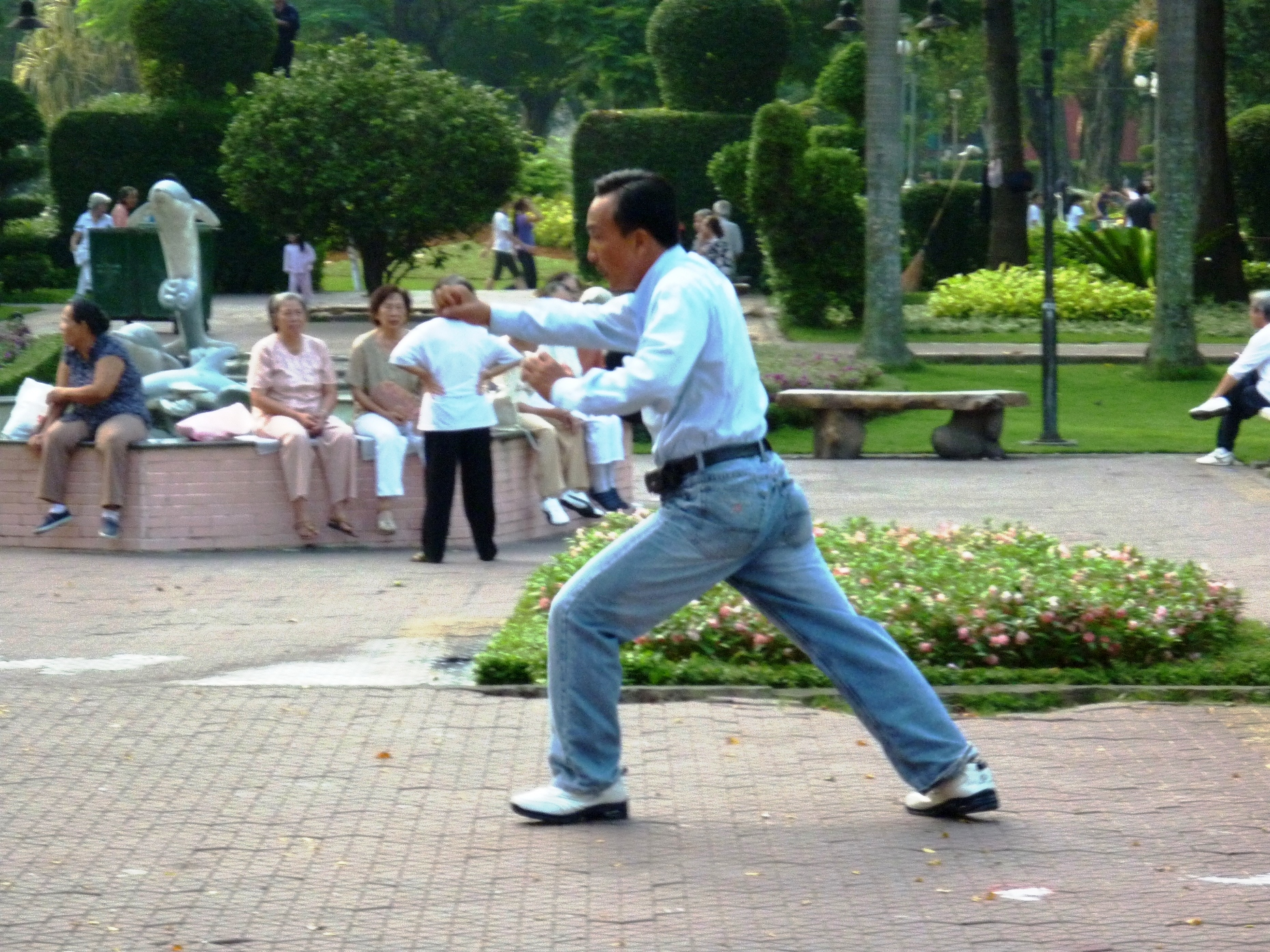
Group of practitioners of Tai chi in the park in the morning.

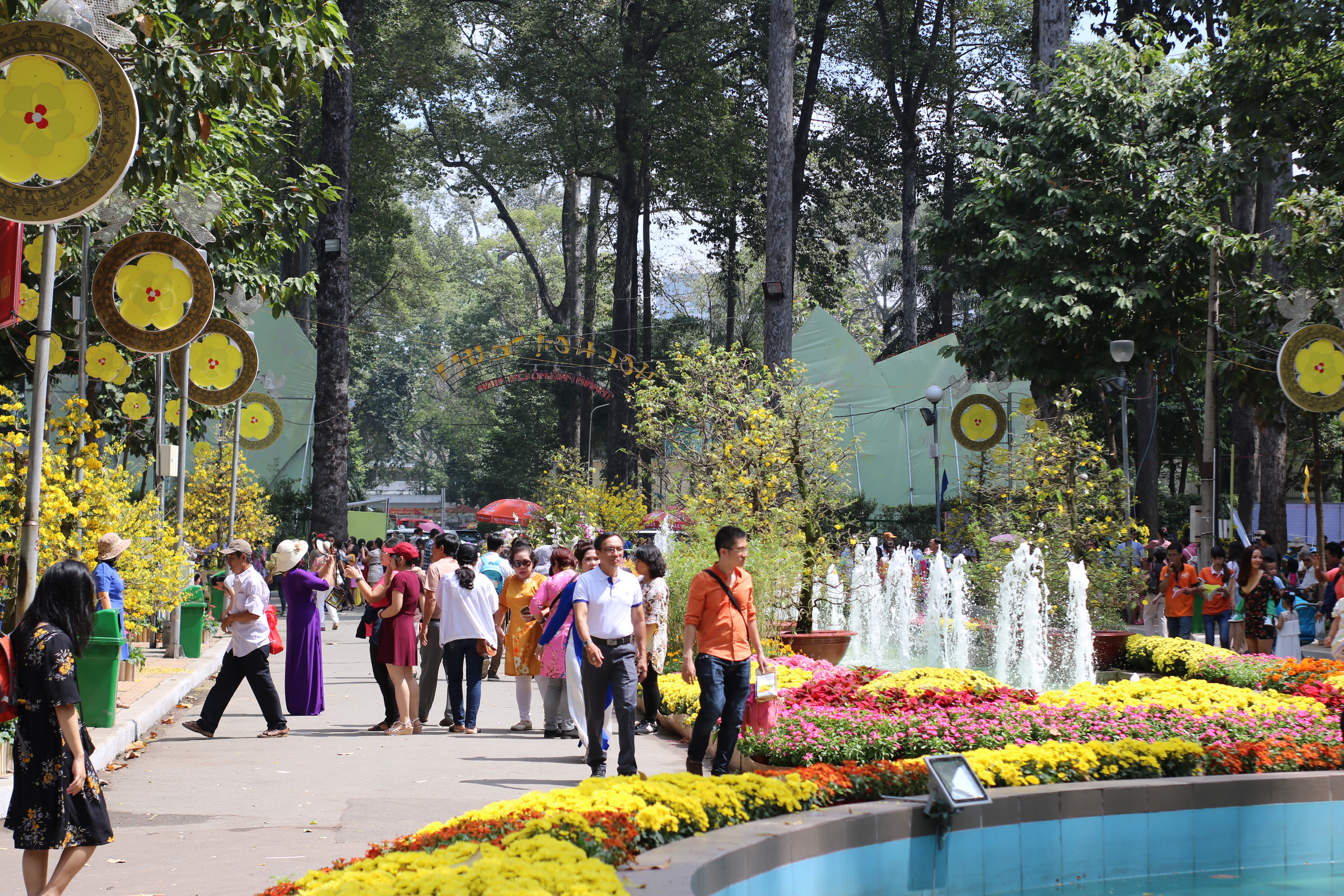
Spring Flowers Festival in Tao Đàn Park

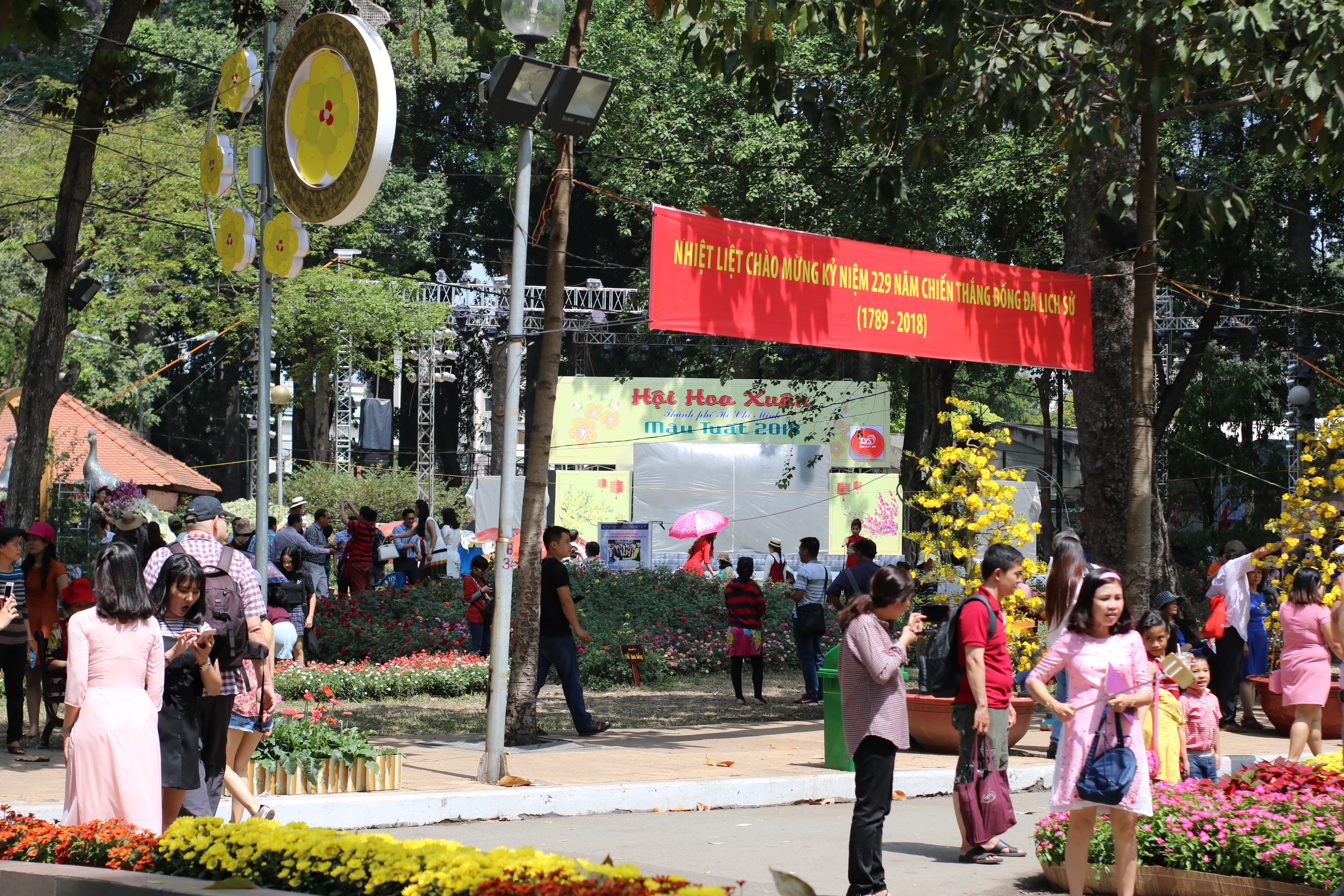
Spring Flowers Festival in Tao Đàn Park

== Bird café ==
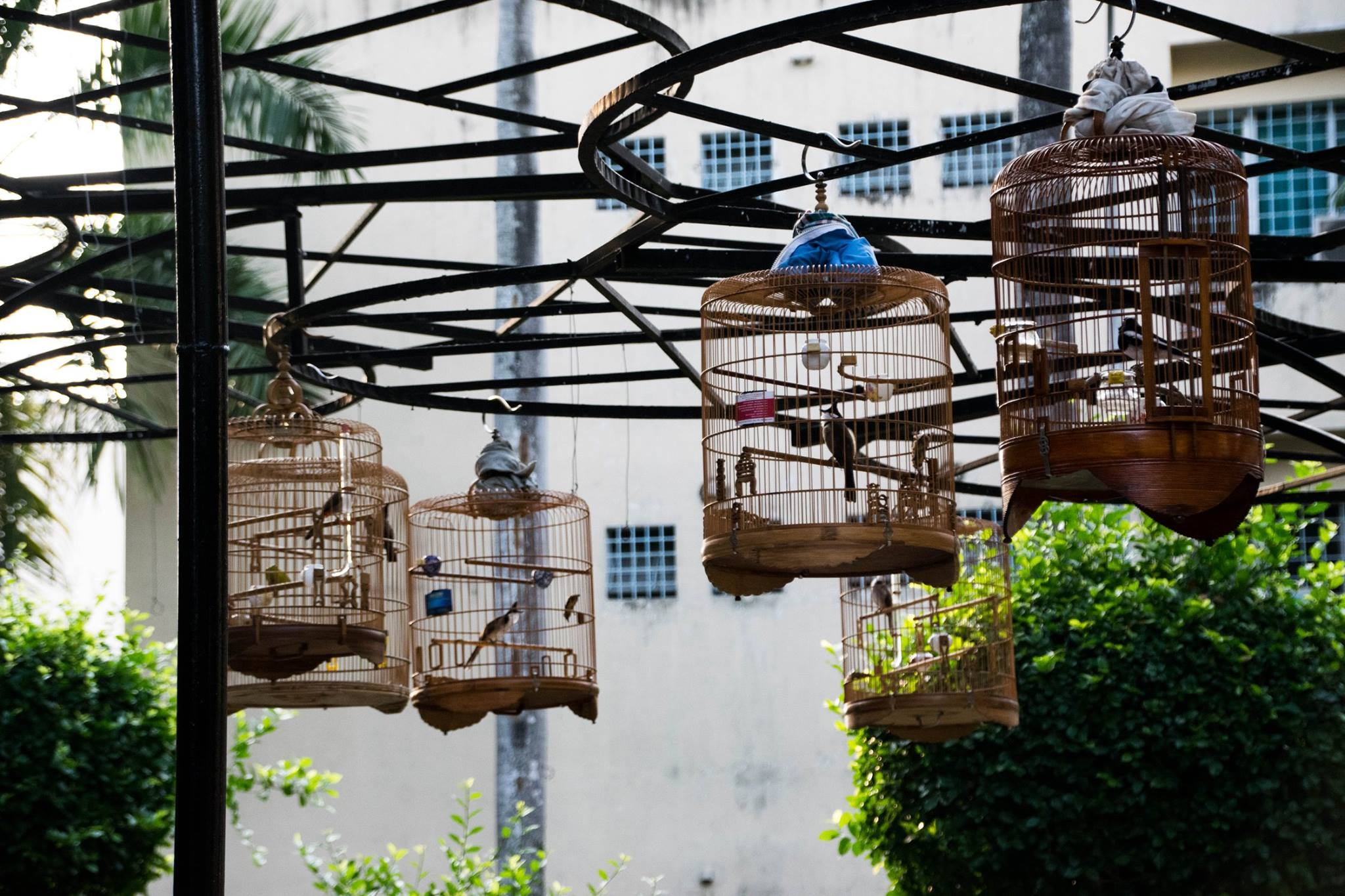
The former Songbird Cafe at Tao Dan Park

The park formerly hosted an outdoor bird café that served coffee and attracted songbird owners, who would hang their birdcages and listen to them sing. Now a construction site for the metro station, the café was moved across the street from the park to Công Đoàn Cafe.
