= Sud-Ouest Bretagne =

French short range airliner with 2 piston engines, 1945

S.O.30 Bretagne
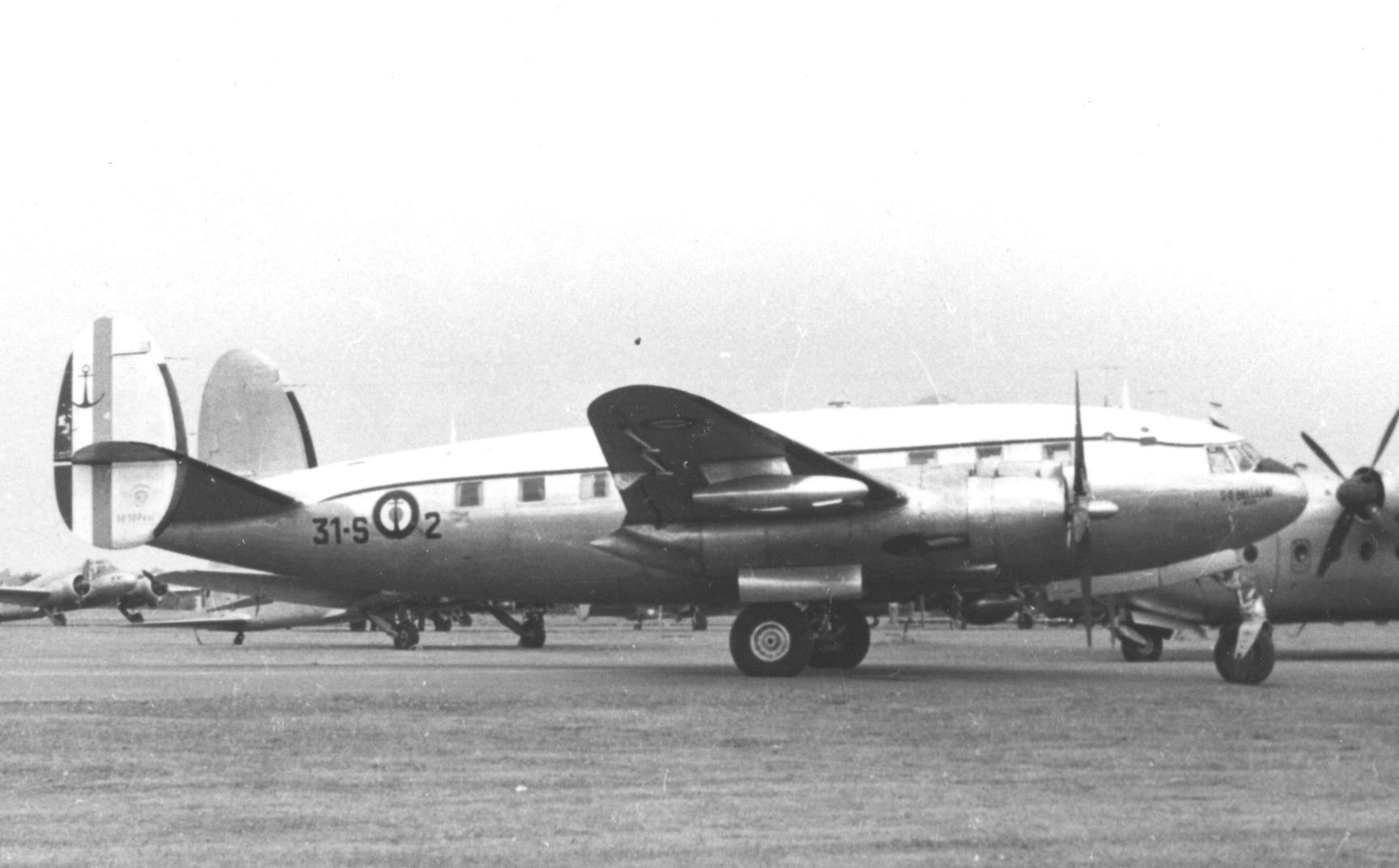
- SO.30P of the Aeronavale equipped with under-wing Palas auxiliary jets at Blackbushe Airport in 1955

General information
- Type: Airliner and military transport
- Manufacturer: Sud-Ouest
- Primary users: Air France French Air Force
- Number built: 45

History
- First flight: 26 February 1945

The Sud-Ouest S.O.30 Bretagne was a 1940s French airliner built by Sud-Ouest.

== Design and development ==
The Bretagne (Engl. "Brittany") was designed by a group of designers and engineers who were based at Cannes from May 1941 following the invasion of France. The design was for a medium capacity civil transport, a twin-engined mid-wing cantilever all-metal monoplane. The prototype (designated the S.O.30N) first flew on 26 February 1945.

== Operational history ==
The initial production version was designated the S.O.30P Bretagne with two versions with different engines. The aircraft operated with a crew of five and could carry between 30 and 43 passengers. A cargo version (the S.O.30C) was produced, with a revised interior and strengthened floor and large cargo door. The aircraft was operated as an airliner, but mainly by the French military forces as a medium transport.

Some aircraft were fitted with two underwing Turbomeca Palas turbojet engines for auxiliary power. Other aircraft were used for engine-trials fitted with the SNECMA Atar 101 and licence-built Rolls-Royce Nene turbojets.

== Variants ==
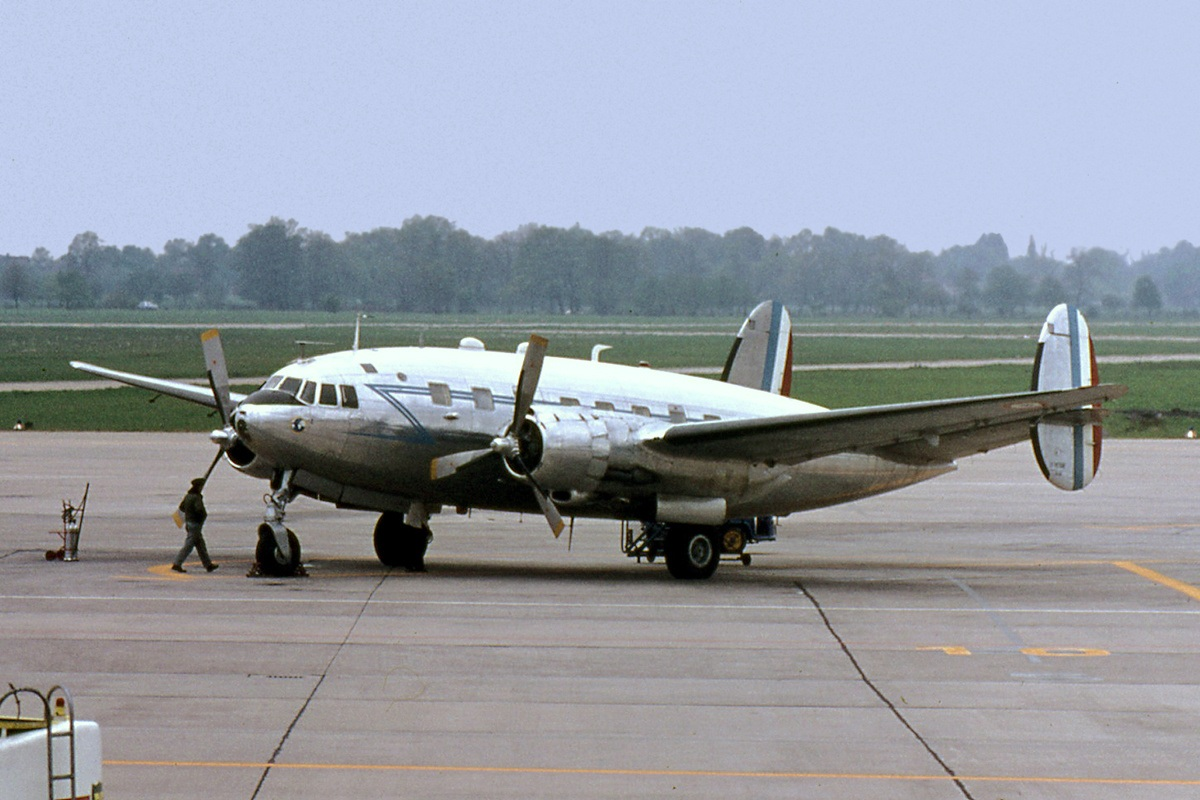
Sud-Ouest S.O.30P Bretagne in Hanover in 1968

S.O.30N
Tailwheel undercarriage prototype, c/n 01 built after the 1940 armistice and stored till after the war. The second S.O.30R c/n 02 was built in 1946 and later converted to the S.O.30 Nene, jet powered airliner test-bed.
S.O.30R Bellatrix
Two prototypes of the nosewheel undercarriage production model.
S.O.30C
cargo version, one built with belly loading hatches.
S.O.30P-1
production version with Pratt & Whitney R-2800-B43 engines.
S.O.30P-2
production version with Pratt & Whitney R-2800-CA13 engines.
S.O.30 Nene
One aircraft converted from S.O.30R c/n 02 for use as a testbed, powered by two Rolls-Royce Nenes.

== Operators ==
=== Military operators ===
France

- French Air Force
- French Navy

=== Civil operators ===
Algeria

- Air Algérie

France

- Aigle Azur
- Air France
- COSARA based in French Indo-China

Iran

- Iranian Airways

Morocco

- Air Maroc

== Specifications (S.O.30P-2) ==
Data from Jane's All The World's Aircraft 1953–54, French Post-War Transport Aircraft

General characteristics

- Crew: 4
- Capacity: 43 passengers
- Length: 18.95 m (62 ft 2 in)
- Wingspan: 26.9 m (88 ft 3 in)
- Height: 5.9 m (19 ft 4 in)
- Wing area: 86.2 m^{2} (928 sq ft)
- Empty weight: 14,000 kg (30,865 lb)
- Max takeoff weight: 20,250 kg (44,644 lb)
- Powerplant: 2 × Pratt & Whitney R-2800-CA18 18-cyl. air-cooled radial piston engines, 1,815 kW (2,434 hp) each for take-off with water injection
- Powerplant: 2 × Turbomeca Palas optional 1.47 kN (330 lbf) turbojet booster engines under the outer wings
- Propellers: 4-bladed constant-speed fully feathering propellers

Performance

- Maximum speed: 575 km/h (357 mph, 310 kn)
- Cruise speed: 438 km/h (272 mph, 237 kn)
- Range: 2,175 km (1,351 mi, 1,174 nmi)
- Service ceiling: 8,000 m (26,000 ft)
- Rate of climb: 6 m/s (1,200 ft/min)

== See also ==
Aircraft of comparable role, configuration, and era

- Curtiss C-46 Commando
- Vickers Valetta
- Ilyushin Il-12
- Convair 240

Related lists

- List of military aircraft of France
