= Tao Đàn station =

Future metro station in Ho Chi Minh City

Tao Dan Station Ga Tao Đàn

General information
- Location: Bến Thành, District 1, Ho Chi Minh City, Vietnam
- Coordinates: 10°46′21″N 106°41′28″E
- System: Ho Chi Minh City Metro
- Line: L2 L3

Construction
- Structure type: Underground

Other information
- Status: Under construction

History
- Opening: 2030

Services
Preceding station	Ho Chi Minh City Metro	Following station
Ben Thanh 01 Terminus	Line 2 Phase 1 - Opening 2030-2032	Dân Chủ 03 towards Tân Bình
Từ Dũ L3 17 towards An Hạ	Line 3 Proposed	Turtle Lake L3 19 towards Hiệp Bình Phước
Location

Tao Đàn Station (Vietnamese: Ga Tao Đàn) is a future underground Ho Chi Minh City Metro station on Line 2 and the future Line 3. The station will be located under Tao Đàn Park.

== Surrounding area ==
Some of notable buildings and administrative agencies around the station:

- Independence Palace
- Bến Thành Market
- Tao Đàn Park
- Trống Đồng Outdoor Theatre (demolished)
- Ho Chi Minh City Cultural Palace for Labors
- Ho Chi Minh City Department of Health
- Ho Chi Minh City Department of Food Safety
- Ho Chi Minh City Department of Public Security
- Ho Chi Minh City Department Of Finance
- Ho Chi Minh City Immigration Office
- Consulate General of South Korea, Ho Chi Minh City
- War Remnants Museum
- Mother Goddess Temple
- Xá Lợi Pagoda
- Nguyễn An Ninh Street – Halal District
- The Venerable Thích Quảng Đức Monument
- Lê Quý Đôn Secondary School and High School
- Nguyễn Thị Minh Khai High School
- Colette Secondary School
- Ho Chi Minh City Open University – Campus 1
- Music Conservatory of Ho Chi Minh City
- Nguyễn Du Gymnasium
- Labor Union Hotel (Nhà Khách Công Đoàn)
- Rạng Đông Hotel
- Saigon Star Hotel
- New World Saigon Hotel
- A&B Tower
- Zen Plaza Tower
- Lim Tower 2
- Thánh Gióng statue at the round-a-bout named after him
