= COSARA =

Vietnamese airline (1947–1955)

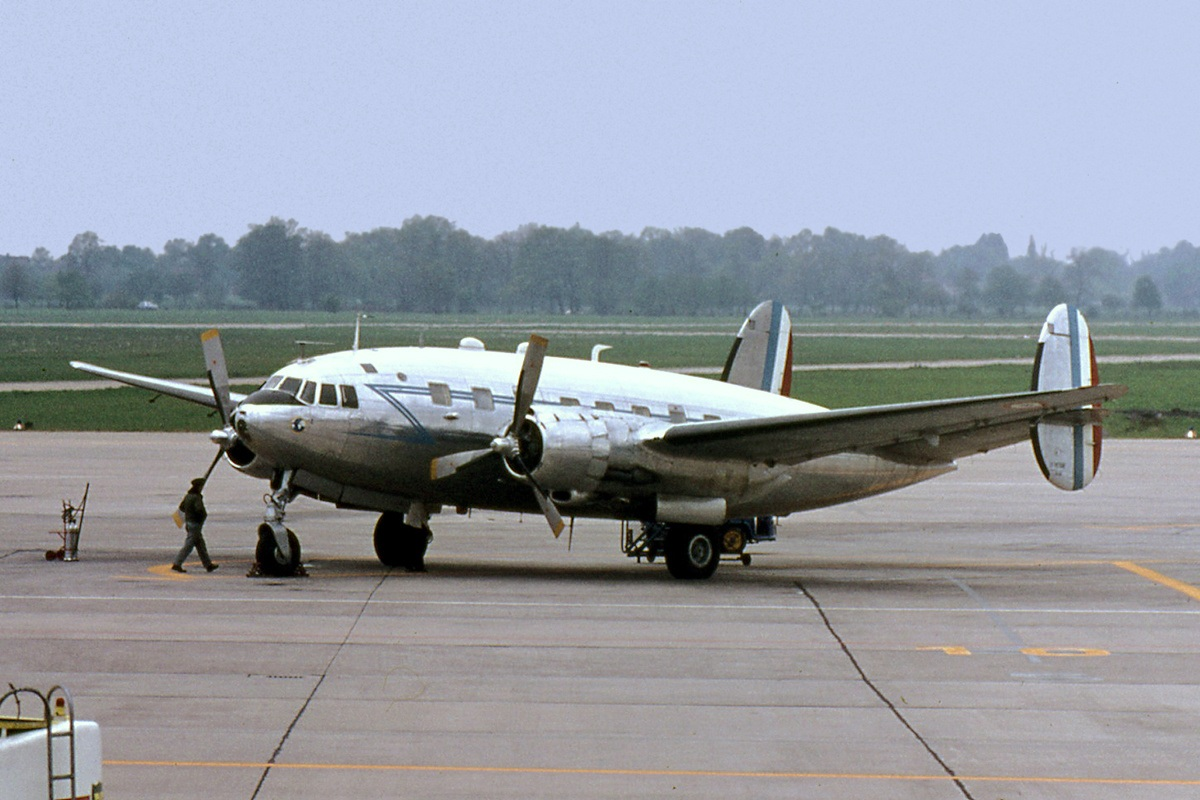
Sud-Oest SO-30P Bretagne - this type of aircraft was flown by COSARA from 1952

COSARA (Comptoirs Saigonnais de Ravitaillements) was a Vietnamese aviation and transport company founded by Maurice Loubière. The company's office was located at 5–13, Turc Street, Saigon - now Ho Huan Nghiep Street, Ho Chi Minh City.

== Origin of the company ==
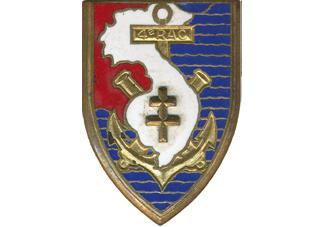
4th Colonial Artillery Regiment Badge

Loubière was posted to the French 4th Colonial Artillery Regiment, based in Hanoi in 1929, to undertake his military service. Once in Hanoi he learnt Vietnamese and became the regiment's interpreter. In September 1942, he started his own business, Les Comptoirs des Industries Locales, which provided provisions for the Army. Indo-China was controlled by the French Vichy government at this time although occupied by the Japanese.

On 9 September 1947 Loubière, along with one of his Vietnamese friends, founded COSARA (Comptoirs Saigonnais de Ravitaillements). The company's aim was to transport air freight supplies to army units scattered around Vietnam by using the airfields built by the Japanese during World War II. COSARA was based on the civilian side of the former Japanese airbase of Tan Son Nhut Air Base near Saigon. During the same period, COSARA also ran a trucking business to carry supplies from the airports to their destinations. The airlines corporate office was located at corporate office at 5-13 Hô Huân Nghiêp Street in Saigon.

== First aircraft ==
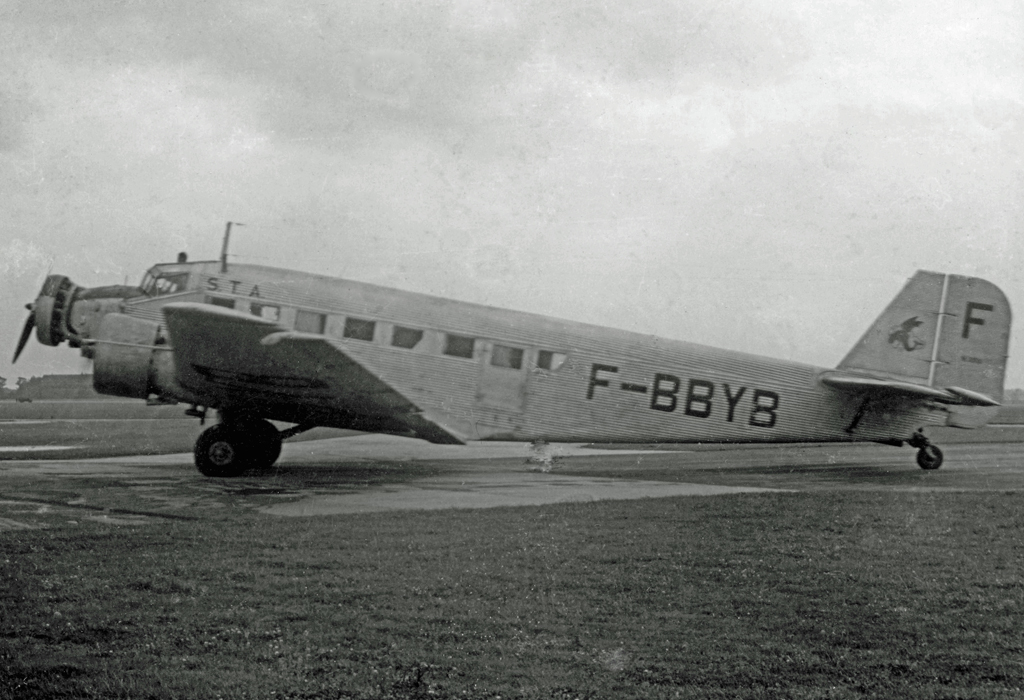
An STA Amiot AAC.1 (Ju 52 copy)

In September 1947 COSARA leased an Amiot AAC.1 Toucan from STA (Société Transatlantique Aérienne). The company was also granted the right to carry passengers between Saigon and Sóc Trăng, Phnom-Penh, and Laos. A second AAC.1 was leased from STA that same year. STA also became a shareholder in COSARA.

In 1948 COSARA added three Swissair Douglas C-47's to its fleet.

An aviation branch, STAEO (Société Transatlantique Aérienne d’Extrême-Orient) was set up as a subsidiary of COSARA. The passenger routes were expanded to include Tourane, Huế, Hanoi, and Tayninh. By 1950 these were expanded again to include Phan Thiết, and Vientiane.

Prince Savang, Luang Prabang, Laos became a member of the board and Air France a shareholder.

== War service ==
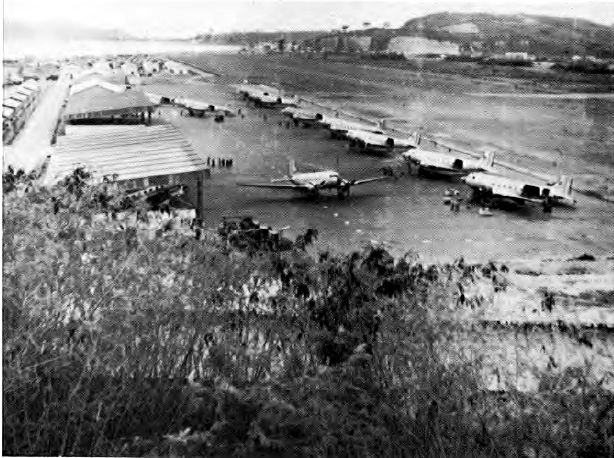
French Douglas C-47s at Haiphong in 1954

In 1949 COSARA provided assistance to the French Army during the First Indochina War by evacuating wounded soldiers from Sóc Trăng at its own expense. A gesture that earned the praise of General Blaizot. In 1952 COSARA was nominated for the Grand Cross of the Legion of Honor military medal for transporting 230 military passengers from Saigon to Hanoi between 10 and 12 December 1951. Also that same year a COSARA C-47 was shot down on takeoff by the Viet Minh at Phan Thiet.

COSARA participated in Operation Cognac evacuating 6,000 people from North Vietnam to South Vietnam between 22 August and 4 October 1954 and tied in with the much larger Operation Passage to Freedom.

== Growth and humanitarian aid ==
Four additional C-47s were added to COSARA's fleet between 1951 and 1953 and two Sud-Ouest SO.30 Bretagne's were added on 24 July 1952. The SO.30s were named Bac Hac and Van Huong From 1953 to 1954 a further two C-47s were added to the fleet along with five SO.30s.

During 1953 COSARA under its Vietnamese managing director, Mr Phạm Hòe, provided assistance to the Vietnamese Red Cross, transporting medical staff and supplies.

== Demise ==
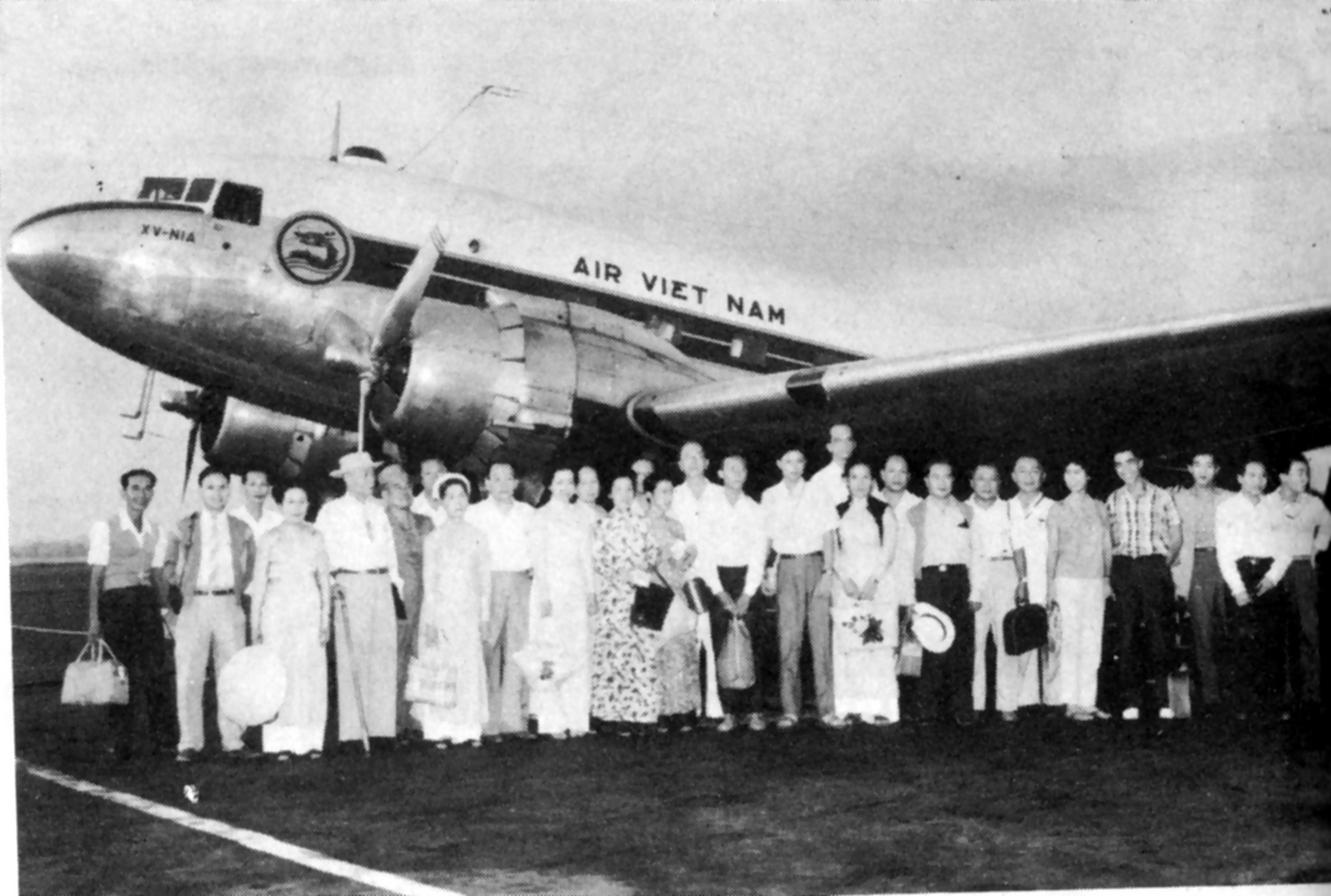
An Air Vietnam C-47 similar to the former COSARA C-47s that were transferred to Air Vietnam

On 20 July 1954 Vietnam was partitioned into North and South Vietnam and by 1955 COSARA had ceased flying. Its C-47s were sold to Air Vietnam and its SO.30s to the French Navy. Its operations base at Tan Son Nhut was taken over by Air Vietnam and became an international airport. Maurice Loubière returned to France after the company ceased operations.

== Fleet ==
Aircraft	Total	Introduced	Retired	Notes	Photos
Amiot AAC.1 Toucan	2	1947	1950s	Leased from Société Transatlantique Aérienne	
Douglas C-47	7	1948	1955	Three leased from Swissair	
Sud-Ouest SO.30 Bretagne	7	1952	1955		

One of the C-47's, a Dakota IV KK110, serial number: 43-49300 (MSN 15116/26561), had served with the No. 52 Squadron RAF. On 10 April 1945 is had ditched in river 5 miles south of Khulna, India after running out of fuel in bad weather. Later recovered and repaired, the C-47 was sold to Societe Transatlantique Airienne as F-BEIB. On 15 October 1948 it was acquired by COSARO (Ste Du Comptoir Saigonnais De Ravitaillement) and then transferred to COSARO's subsidiary Societe De Transports Aeriens en Extreme Orient (STAEO) on 6 September 1949. It was shot down on takeoff by the Viet Minh at Phan Thiet, Vietnam on 4 May 1952. The pilot elected to attempt to return to the airfield but was forced to make an emergency landing crash landing in a nearby field. The plane had 14 occupants, one of whom was killed in the crash.
