= Vietnam Red Cross Society =

Vietnamese humanitarian organization

- Viet Nam Red Cross Society
- Hội Chữ thập đỏ Việt Nam
- Logo and symbol of the VNRC. It uses the bamboo leaves symbolism as a reference to the Vietnamese culture.
- Predecessor: (South Vietnam) Vietnamese Red Cross
- Formation: November 23, 1946; 79 years ago (Democratic Republic of Vietnam); July 31, 1976; 50 years ago (current form since the formal Reunification of Vietnam)
- Merger of: (North Vietnam) (North) Vietnam Red Cross Society (Provisional Revolutionary Government of the Republic of South Vietnam) Red Cross organization of the National Liberation Front of South Vietnam
- Purpose: Humanitarian
- Headquarters: 82 Nguyễn Du St., Hai Bà Trưng District, Hanoi
- Members: International Red Cross and Red Crescent Movement (from 1957, as North Vietnam)
- Honorary President of the Society: Vietnamese President Lương Cường
- Headquarters President of the Society: Bùi Thị Hòa
- Parent organization: Vietnamese Fatherland Front
- Website: http://redcross.org.vn/
- Formerly called: Vietnamese: Hội Hồng thập tự Việt Nam

The Vietnam Red Cross Society (VNRC; Vietnamese: Hội Chữ thập đỏ Việt Nam), alternatively the Viet Nam Red Cross Society or the Vietnamese Red Cross Society, is the Vietnamese national affiliation of the International Federation of Red Cross and Red Crescent Societies and domestically a member of the Vietnam Fatherland Front. The organisation was established during the First Indochina War, and originally had two branches. The Northern branch was established in Hanoi in 1946, and the Southern branch was established by Dr Ho Van Nhut in Saigon in 1951.

The Southern branch functioned separately from the Northern Branch and was officially recognized by the International Committee of the Red Cross, to address the increasing needs for assistance to Vietnamese civilians caught in the conflict between North and South Vietnam during the Indochina War and to those affected by natural disasters. The official name of the organization was Vietnamese Red Cross (VRC), with its headquarters at an avenue in central Saigon named after the organization. The VRC played an important role in the program of aid to the million refugees from North to South Vietnam, following the Geneva Agreement in 1954.
