= Alcalde and Fay =

Lobbying firm in Arlington, Virginia

Alcalde & Fay is a lobbying firm based in Arlington, Virginia. The firm consists of over 35 former politicians, public relations specialists, lawyers, journalists, and corporate executives. A team of Alcalde & Fay associates and a senior partner handles clients. The firm practices in all areas of legislative affairs, communications, and government marketing.

== History ==
Hector Alcalde founded the firm in 1973 and still serves as the company's Chairman. Alcalde's partner, Kevin J. Fay, serves as the firm's president and specializes in environmental and energy affairs. Fay is also currently the executive director of the International Climate Change Partnership.

In 2009, Barry Zorthian (1920-2010), most notably a senior press officer during the Vietnam War, was a communications consultant with the firm.

Former Florida Congressman Louis A. "Skip" Bafalis was a consultant with the firm.

In 2011, the firm said it had 45 partners and staff members.

== Clients ==
Alcade & Fay represents a wide range of agencies, institutions, and municipalities. The firm's total lobbying income in 2006 was $10,300,000 and increased marginally in the following four years. The billings by client, and the clients by A&F employee, the top issues addressed as identified in quarterly federal lobbying reports, the agencies lobbied, the bills and related clients lobbied, and reports prepared by the firm are all detailed by OpenSecrets. The top six issues addressed in the first eight months of 2011: Fed Budget & Appropriations (162 quarterly reports), Environment & Superfund (84), Transportation, Clean Air & Water (34), Homeland Security (27) and Urban Development (23).

The firm's full list of clients, past and present, is maintained on its website.

In a Florida port authority presentation in 2011, co-founder Fay said the firm has "what has grown to be the largest maritime practice in Washington D.C."

== Controversy ==
In 2008, a New York Times article suggested that Alcade & Fay lobbyist Vicki Iseman was involved in an inappropriately close relationship with Sen. John McCain, which may have caused McCain to favor Iseman's communications clients in matters before the Senate Commerce Committee. While the article alleged a possible romantic relationship between McCain and Iseman, the senator's presidential campaign vehemently denied any personal or professional impropriety. Iseman proceeded by suing The New York Times for defamation; in 2009, the paper settled, and published a 'Note to Readers' stating 'The Times did not intend to conclude that Ms. Iseman had engaged in a romantic affair with Senator McCain or an unethical relationship on behalf of her clients in breach of the public trust.'
