= Portrayal of the Islamic State in American media =

The portrayal of ISIL in American media has largely been negative. The Islamic State of Iraq and the Levant (ISIL) has been linked in the American media to several atrocities throughout the Middle East. Most recently U.S. coverage has linked ISIL members to burning alive the Royal Jordanian Air Force pilot Muath al-Kasasbeh, the beheadings of journalists James Foley and Steven Sotloff, and most recently, because the perpetrator of the June 2016 Orlando mass shooting—America's second deadliest—reportedly pledged allegiance to ISIL and its leader in a phone call to 911 operators just before the incident. The American public was introduced to ISIL with these actions. This contrasts with the renewed prominence of al-Qaeda after the September 11 attacks in the media. That coverage focused on the United States' response to the attacks, while the coverage of ISIL started with the organization itself and evolved to cover America's potential strategy.

== News media ==
After the killing of American journalist James Foley in August 2014 by members of ISIL, the newspaper The Record, based out of Bergen County, New Jersey, wrote an article that portrayed ISIL as a group wanting to humiliate and destroy the United States, a result of the beheading of James Foley. As the article states, by humiliating and destroying the United States, ISIL looks to rid the U.S. of its power so it that it may no longer be a "dominant player in the world." It cites what Al Qaeda did to the Manhattan skyline on September 11 as the impact it too wants to see in the future.

ISIL has been portrayed as successful at attracting individuals to its cause. Following the shootings at the Canadian Parliament and War Memorial, an article in Bloomberg News stated "The Islamic State is proving more successful at attracting vulnerable Canadian youth to its cause than al-Qaida ever was, and terrorism experts attribute that in part to the group's military success and its brash use of social media." Authors Liezel Hill, Scott Deveau and Gerrit De Vynck, cite the country's air strikes on Syria as a motivation to join the cause, as well as the decision to prevent people from leaving Canada for Syria as a reason to continue the group's mission at home.

CNN reported the story of a former US soldier who is now in northern Syria, serving as a volunteer fighter in the Kurdish militia, or the YPG, against ISIL. The soldier, Jordan Matson, states how many US allied countries have been threatened by members of ISIS trying to spread their agenda. The article claims that his reason for the decision to join the fight against ISIL in a foreign country is the result of the happenings in Iraq and seeing "All of the American brothers that have died over there -- all the American veterans that have died over there -- and paid their lives for that country so they could have a democracy." In this article CNN portrays ISIL as a group opposing the agenda of the US and specifically their fight for democracy in Iraq. In another report from CNN, ISIL is portrayed as something that is appealing particularly to young individuals. This report comes on the heels of a propaganda video released by ISIL showing a Canadian youth "who enjoyed ice hockey, going to the cabin, and fishing," who then left Canada for Syria to "live properly as a Muslim." With the report that more than 30 Canadians have joined ISIL in Syria and more than 100 people have joined in other countries like Yemen, Pakistan, and Afghanistan, CNN is portraying ISIL as something that gives an individual "identity and purpose" for youth Muslims.

To show the power of ISIL and what they are capable of, CNN did a report on what had happened to more than 50 members of the Albu Nimr tribe, the last people in the western Baghdad-based tribe who were resisting against joining ISIL. The whereabouts of these holdouts taken captive is unknown, but as CNN reports, they are "likely dead, the latest casualties of ISIS who have killed hundreds of members of the tribe in mass executions in recent days." As a result, we can see that members of ISIS are portrayed as violent.

ISIS is believed to be one of the best funded groups in recent years due to their strategy of capturing and running oil fields to sell to black markets, making a projected 3 million dollars a day since July 2014.

US Media has also played the human interest element by espousing their belief of the Jihadist bride practice, in which fighters for ISIS are awarded wives as the spoils of war. The US Media has observed young woman willingly leave to become brides of ISIS fighters.

American newspapers have also reported on the justifications that the United States government has for ordering the airstrikes targeting ISIL members. As the Associated Press reported, "A U.S.-led coalition has been launching airstrikes on Islamic State militants and facilities in Iraq and Syria for months, as part of an effort to give Iraqi forces the time and space to mount a more effective offensive." By stating what problems that ISIS has created, the American media is portraying ISIS as deserving of the actions that the U.S. military is taking against them. This reasoning also justifies why President Barack Obama ordered another 1,500 troops to Iraq in order to stop the progress of ISIL, as CNN reported.

The Fairness and Accuracy in Reporting group has released findings about guests on several Sunday morning talk news programs and their feelings towards war. Their September–October 2014 research showed that of the 205 people who appeared on Sunday morning programs, like CNN's State of the Union or CBS's Face the Nation, to discuss military options in Syria and Iraq, only six of these guests, or three percent, voiced opposition to a US military intervention.

== Social media ==
ISIS is believed to actively use malicious programs on computers and mobile devices such as cell phones in order to create social media floods, creating the perception that ISIS has more support and is bigger than it actually is around the world.

Muslims who are not ISIL members are using social media to get their side out to the world and show that just because they are Muslim, they do not want to be associated with ISIL. They have united under the hashtag, #NotInMyName to reflect that followers of Islam do not wholly support ISIL.

During the celebrations of Halloween 2014, many Americans chose to dress in ISIL themed Halloween costumes. Images of these outfits flooded social media as women dressed in "sexy" ISIL costumes, and some of the more perverse costumes containing fake swords and severed heads. After these photos surfaced there was a great deal of backlash in the American media.

According to Mideast expert and Fox News contributor Walid Phares, there are two scenarios that could have come from the costumes. "One is that they would wear ISIS type clothing and mingle with the Halloween celebrants, mostly in public places, and perform violence and film it with devices. The videos produced would be extensively used by ISIS or jihadists for propaganda purposes. They would claim having hit the enemy at home, while wearing jihadi uniforms." Phares argues that ISIS could argue that they had garnered support within the United States, regardless of how many costumes were legitimate. Phares argues that there is a second implication of the costumes. "A second projected scenario, would be a trigger violence and draw law enforcement into reaction, and having law enforcement disoriented by the fact that many youth would be in ISIS clothing, with possible tragic incidents following. There are many scenarios which can be used by jihadi terrorists, particularly by lone wolves." According to Phares, the costumes give unwarranted opportunity for members of ISIS, and those who are not affiliated but work alone, to utilize hysteria and cause panic.

According to an article published in the Huffington Post, one woman received a text from an acquaintance asking for help with her Halloween costume. She reportedly asked to borrow her, "face thing" or her hijab in order to portray the militant group. The woman wished to remain unnamed, but she told the Huffington Post that the text had crossed a line. she said, "She's not just equating what I wear to being Muslim--she's equating it to ISIS."

Justin Moyer of The Washington Post found the costumes to be essential to fighting ISIL. According to Moyer, "On that day [halloween] we make light of our greatest fears by dressing up as them." He admits that ISIS is scary, and mocking them will not bring back the people that they have killed. Moyer continued saying, "But while tactical airstrikes target [ISIL] on the ground, Americans at home can play a strategic game for hearts and minds by making it look uncool to act like angry radicalized adolescents nursing grudges and growing pains." Moyer finished the articles stating, "So forget 'too soon': Let's expose the sullen, anti Semitic, un-Islamic, homophobic rapist brats running around Syria and Iraq for the clowns they are by clothing our kids in balaclavas and black flags this Halloween."

As a result of the inflammatory costumes, #MuslimApologies began trending on Twitter. According to The Huffington Post, many Muslims around the world have found themselves associated with a violent minority that they want nothing to do with. Some officials and activists have taken a stand against the religious profiling, but others have taken a viral approach. The hashtag, #MuslimApologies is meant to be a "tongue-in-cheek humor" with the message, all Muslims should not have to apologize for the actions of a few. And there is a lot more to Islam than the rampant stereotypes. According to the Huffington Post, some of these tweets included, "Sorry for giving a fifth of my annual savings to charity each year #MuslimApologies" and "Sorry for not being a terrorist. #muslimapologies".

== Beheading videos ==
ISIL has recorded many of their beheadings, which in turn broadcast on American news programs. American media outlets such as CNN and others like Al Jazeera America have scaled back their coverage of the actual videos themselves. This has resulted in showing stills from the videos less often and not including graphic descriptions. Some of these moves have been attributed to lessons learned when in 2012 the New York Post published a front page showing a man seconds before being struck by a train.

The videos themselves are often spread on social media. Twitter CEO Dick Costolo spoke on behalf of his company saying: "We have been and are actively suspending accounts as we discover them related to this graphic imagery." The Associated Press reported that Twitter's official policy states: " Twitter allows immediate family members of someone who dies to request image removals, although the company weighs public interest against privacy concerns." The AP also reported that YouTube and Facebook have been actively removing images of the events.

== Name of the group ==
Tom Kent, Deputy managing editor and standards editor of The Associated Press, has written a blog post detailing the organization's decision to refer to the militant group as ISIL. He states that the group's name in Arabic is Al-Dawla Al-Islamiya fi al-Iraq wa al-Sham which means the Islamic State of Iraq and al-Sham. "al Sham" refers to a region that in English is called "the Levant." For that reason the AP uses the name ISIL. "We believe this is the most accurate translation of the group's name and reflects its aspirations to rule over a broad swath of the Middle East," said John Daniszewski, AP vice president.

In an article by Jaime Fuller for The Washington Post, she discussed the importance of the acronym. President Obama appeared on "Meet the Press" with host Chuck Todd, and the two could not agree on what to call the militant group. Obama said, "I'm preparing the country to make sure that we deal with a threat from ISIL." Todd followed this statement saying, "Obviously, if you're going to defeat ISIS, you have used very much stronger language." Todd followed up the interview with a discussion with his panel. He said, "Obviously we refer to it at NBC News as ISIS. The Obama administration, president, says the word ISIL. The last S stands for Syria, the last L they don't want to have stand for Syria." According to the Washington Post article, by using the term ISIL the president is choosing to leave Syria unnamed because it is the country he chose to stay out of last year.

The Washington Post article continued to say that the majority of politicians and media organizations have chosen to use the term ISIL rather than ISIS because of grammar. These organizations argue that when the Arabic name for the group of insurgents is translated into English (Al-Dawla Al-Islamiya fi al-Iraq wa al-Sham) using "the Levant" (a.k.a. ISIL) is the most accurate.

Secretary of State John Kerry has referred to ISIL as "Daesh", a name they abhor and punish people for using in areas they control, urging others to do the same.

== Entertainment media ==
The television show Archer is changing one of its references in the show as a result of the current role of ISIL in the real world. The show's main character, Sterling Archer, works for the International Secret Intelligence Service, which is referred to strictly by the acronym "ISIS" throughout the first five seasons of the show. However, creators of the show have decided to change the acronym in the upcoming sixth season because of the portrayal of the militant group by the same name. As executive producer Matt Thompson said in an interview with the Boston Herald, ISIS is "just the most awful thing, and we didn't want to have anything to do with it."

== Contrasting viewpoints ==
Much of the media coverage has been about the group's actions and United States reactions. Political scientist Noam Chomsky cites the 2003 invasion of Iraq by America and its allies as making the area fertile to grow radicals. The National Review's Ira Straus penned a piece titled "How Obama Caused ISIS" which argues that actions such as the troop withdrawal in Iraq and changing courses resulted in the growth of the organization.

== See also ==
- Islamic State of Iraq and the Levant § Propaganda and social media
- U.S. news media and the Vietnam War
- Media coverage of the Iraq War
- Media coverage of the Gulf War
