= Gloria Emerson =

American author and journalist (1929–2004)

- Born: May 19, 1929; New York City, U.S.
- Died: August 3, 2004 (aged 75); New York City, U.S.
- Occupations: Journalist, author
- Years active: 1956–2004
- Notable work: The New York Times articles; Winners & Losers (1976); Gaza: A Year in the Intifada (1991); Loving Graham Greene (2000)

Gloria Emerson (May 19, 1929 – August 3, 2004) was an American author, journalist and New York Times war correspondent. Emerson received the 1978 National Book Award in Contemporary Thought for Winners and Losers, her book about the Vietnam War. She wrote four books, in addition to articles for Esquire, Harper's, Vogue, Playboy, Saturday Review and Rolling Stone.

== Early life ==
Emerson was born in Manhattan to William B. Emerson and Ruth Shaw Emerson. According to a 1991 profile, Emerson's parents had been wealthy but lost their fortune (much of it derived from oil) through alcoholism.

== Journalism career ==
In 1956 Emerson began writing for newspapers, mostly freelancing for The New York Times, while living in Saigon, Republic of Vietnam. A year later The New York Times employed her to work on the paper's women's page, although she hated writing only about fashion. In 1960 Emerson quit to marry Charles A. Brofferio, the couple moved to Brussels, Belgium but divorced the following year. She was re-hired by The New York Times in 1964 to cover fashion in Paris. Emerson transferred to the paper's London bureau in 1968 where she covered the start of The Troubles in Northern Ireland.

=== John Lennon interview ===
In December 1969, Emerson conducted a contentious and heated interview with John Lennon and Yoko Ono at the headquarters of Apple Records in London. During the interview, she disputed the value of Lennon and Ono's anti-war campaign and questioned their motivations, which enraged Lennon. A recording of the encounter was prominently featured in the 1988 documentary Imagine: John Lennon and the 2006 movie The U.S. vs. John Lennon. Emerson said at the time—and repeated decades later—that she believed the Beatles and Lennon "could have stopped the war" had they performed for US troops in Vietnam.

=== War correspondent ===
In 1970, Emerson convinced the paper to transfer her to Saigon. In an obituary she wrote for herself, she wanted to return "because she had been in that country in 1956 and wanted to go back to write about the Vietnamese people and the immense unhappy changes in their lives, not a subject widely covered by the huge press corps who were preoccupied with covering the military story."

Among her first reports for The New York Times, Emerson exposed false "body counts" and "unearned commendations" to field-grade officers and the use of hard drugs by American soldiers. She also reported on the suffering of the Vietnamese people. At a 1981 conference on the Vietnam War, Emerson declared U.S. spokesman and host of the Five O'Clock Follies Saigon briefings Barry Zorthian "a determined and brilliant liar."

In her self-written obituary, which reporters at the Times discovered on the day she died, Emerson described the plaudits that came her way:

Her dispatches from Vietnam won a George Polk Award for excellence in foreign reporting, and, later, a Matrix Award from New York Women in Communications. Her nonfiction book on the war, Winners & Losers (Random House, 1977), won a National Book Award in 1978 but she described it as "too huge and somewhat messy". Its subject was the effects of the conflict on some Americans, or "an absence of the effect", as she once said.

One of the most quoted parts of the book was Emerson's condemnation of "killing at a distance":

Americans cannot perceive — even the most decent among us — the suffering caused by the United States air war in Indochina and how huge are the graveyards we have created there. To a reporter recently returned from Vietnam, it often seems that much of our fury and fear is reserved for busing, abortion, mugging, and liberation of some kind. ... As Anthony Lewis once wrote, our military technology is so advanced that we kill at a distance and insulate our consciences by the remoteness of the killing.

Her Vietnam War experiences attached to Marine assault units prompted her investigation into human psychology - especially male - in Some American Men (Simon & Schuster, 1985). This work goes describes the dilemma men face, especially in wartime. Some of her subjects were Vietnam War veterans, some of whom were close friends. She tried to understand the demarcation point existing between American men and women regarding duty and the facing of certain death.

== Personal life ==
She was married to Charles A. Brofferio from 1960 to 1961. On her application to The New York Times in 1957, Emerson described herself as a widow, giving her married name as Znamiecki.

== Death ==
Emerson was diagnosed with Parkinson's disease in 2004. Unable to contemplate a future in which she could not write, Emerson died by suicide on August 3, 2004.

== Published works ==
=== Winners and Losers ===
Published in 1976, the book covers Emerson's time in America and Vietnam before, during, and after the Vietnam War. Winners and Losers is based on interviews with American and Vietnamese soldiers and civilians. The Chicago Tribune called it "sensitive, moral, compelling . . . a book of genuine greatness and largeness of spirit." Winners and Losers won the National Book Award for Contemporary Thought in 1978. An anniversary edition was published by W. W. Norton & Company in 2014.

=== Some American Men ===
The book, which was first published in 1985, is a series of interviews of American men investigating their clinical psychology with reference to Dr. Robert May, whose book Sex and Fantasy: Patterns of Male and Female Development, is indicated by Emerson to have served her as her inspiration. Some American Men is an analysis of typical male American personae in relation to themselves and to the world - especially as it relates to the opposite sex and notions of duty. Emerson delineates real-life examples of men "manfully" withholding personal emotional pain at considerable personal expense, due to a sense of "what (America) expected of them." Many of her interview subjects were Vietnam War combat veterans, but it includes asides to many American male survivors of Korea and World War II as well. "Some American Men : On Their Lives" Simon & Schuster 1985.

=== Gaza, a Year in the Intifada ===
This 1991 book is about a year she spent in the occupied territories. Gaza, a Year in the Intifada provoked hostility among friends, and others felt it was anti-Israel but Emerson insisted in her self written obituary that this was not her intention, instead she "hoped to provide a primer for those who felt the situation in the Middle East was too complicated or too controversial to understand." She won a 1991 James Aronson Award for Social Justice Journalism for the book.

=== Loving Graham Greene ===
In 2000 Emerson published her only novel. It was described by William Boyd in The New York Times Book Review as "beguiling and memorable... a funny, moving and strangely profound novel." Loving Graham Greene sprang from Emerson's fascination with the British novelist Graham Greene whom she had interviewed in Antibes in March 1978 for the magazine Rolling Stone. It is set partly in Princeton, New Jersey, where she lived (and taught) for many years, and in Algiers, where she visited briefly in 1992 at the outset of the Algerian civil war which claimed the lives of an estimated 100,000 people. This fiction is the distillation of Emerson's experience as a journalist and an activist. This novel was the first book by Emerson to be translated into a foreign language and appeared in France in April 2007.

== Awards ==
- George Polk Award for excellence in foreign reporting (1971)
- National Book Award for non-fiction (1978), for Winners and Losers (1976)
