= Five O'Clock Follies =

Sobriquet for military press briefings in the Vietnam War

The Five O'Clock Follies is a sobriquet for military press briefings that occurred during the Vietnam War.

The briefings were conduction by the Military Assistance Command, Vietnam (MACV) Office of Information and held at Saigon's Rex Hotel.

In September 1964, at the direction of Barry Zorthian, the Joint United States Public Affairs Office Director, daily press briefings at 16:45 replaced the former weekly press briefings.

In early 1966 the number of MACV spokesmen increased from 1 to 4, creating two alternating teams of two briefers each. One officer on a team specialized in the ground war, and the other dealt only with the air war. Later a third briefer was added to each team to cover actions involving the U.S. Navy.

Richard Pyle, Associated Press Saigon bureau chief during the war, described the briefings as, "the longest-playing tragicomedy in Southeast Asia's theater of the absurd." Journalists alternately cracked cynical jokes and shouted at officials, often complaining about a credibility gap between official reports and the truth. Barry Zorthian once lamented that where the US government's word was once true until proven false, in Vietnam, it would be questioned until proven true.

The last session of the Five O'Clock Follies took place on 27 January 1973, the day the Paris Peace Accords took effect.

Journalists updated the name during the Gulf War. Press briefings at that time were unofficially known as the "Four O'Clock Follies."

== See also ==
- United States news media and the Vietnam War
