= Zorthian =

Zorthian is an Armenian surname. Notable people with the surname include:

- Barry Zorthian (1920–2010), American diplomat, press officer during the Vietnam war, media executive, and lobbyist
- Jirayr Zorthian (1911–2004), Armenian American artist
