= Joint United States Public Affairs Office =

The Joint United States Public Affairs Office (JUSPAO) was a multi-agency organization that provided integrated Information Operations support in South Vietnam from 1965 to 1972. Involving military, US Information Agency and State Department efforts, JUSPAO provided direction for a range of public affairs, public diplomacy and psychological operations.

== Designation and objectives ==
The United States Information Agency (USIA) had several integral components, one of the most important being the United States Information Service (USIS) during the Vietnam War. The USIS, the overseas component of the USIA, sought to foster a sympathetic understanding of American culture abroad and to build public support for U.S. foreign policy in other nations around the world.

During a visit to South Vietnam in March 1965, Carl Rowan and General Harold K. Johnson, the Director of the United States Information Agency and the Army Chief of Staff respectively, observed the many difficulties and inefficiencies of the uncoordinated psychological operations, also known as "PSYOPs". The officials reached out to President Lyndon B. Johnson and recommended that he integrate all foreign information and PSYOP activities into a single office. The president would soon approve this recommendation, combining the United States Information Service (USIS), Military Assistance Command Vietnam (MACV), and the United States Agency for International Development (USAID). The Joint United States Public Affairs Office was officially created on 14 May 1965 in United States Embassy Instruction 186. The USIS Director in Vietnam, Barry Zorthian, was designated as the initial Director of JUSPAO. Zorthian had experience working with the USIA in the Asian mainland as he previously served as the deputy director of the USIS in New Delhi, India and worked as a scriptwriter and program manager for the Voice of America (VOA).

Zorthian's official title was the United States Mission Coordinator for Psychological Operations with responsibilities including developing PSYOP guidance for all elements of the United States military in South Vietnam. The intended purpose of JUSPAO was not just to de-conflict and coordinate the activities of various involved agencies, but also to play the overall PSYOP strategy that would be followed. JUSPAO's official goal was to build on anti-communist nationalism throughout Indochina in support of the Chieu Hoi Program or break the will of the North Vietnamese People's Army of Vietnam (PAVN) and Vietcong in order to end the conflict.

== Operations ==
In conjunction with several other USIA branches, the JUSPAO conducted an enormous amount of PSYOPS during the Vietnam War. Most of their operations aimed to win the "hearts and minds" of the Vietnamese people. Between 1965 and 1972 the United States Air Force dropped approximately 50 million leaflets over North Vietnam, South Vietnam, Laos, and Cambodia, the United States Navy often handed out pro-American brochures during routine searched of merchant ships, and the USIA and JUSPAO filled available airwaves with anti-communist radio broadcasts. The Army also joined the PSYOPs program during the war when it created four separate psychological operation battalions, each of which possessed its own printing plant, photographic and tape recording production equipment, and loudspeaker trucks.

The United States government quickly enlisted JUSPAO to achieve its ambitions in Southeast Asia, which determined to defend and build a nation through the complete integration of the military, political, economic, and psychological dimensions of action. The other agencies were the United States Embassy in Saigon for political actions, MACV for military aspects, USAID for economic support, the Mission Press Center for media relations, and finally JUSPAO for psychological programs. Daily operations required constant, complete, and detailed collaboration between the various agencies, which was a feature that was often criticized during the war, but JUSPAO and Zorthian attempted to work as closely as possible with military personnel. The director and officers formed relationships that allowed for a flow of information and advice between the two branches, however, the daily briefings held at JUSPAO would emphasize the issues that surrounded the operations of the USIS in Vietnam.

The JUSPAO began to host daily briefings updating the American and foreign press on the progress of the war. These meetings occurred every day at 4:45pm and were hosted by the Military Assistance Command Office of Information (MACOI). After 1966 all of the briefings were held in the JUSPAO auditorium at the Rex Hotel in Saigon under the direction of Barry Zorthian. Army colonels trained in public relations passed out summaries of the meetings and pointed to colored charts to impress journalists with the United States' achievements. By 1967, JUSPAO had established itself as one of the main sources of news that the press had access to. Since the topics discussed were under close supervision of the government, military setbacks encountered by American troops and operations by South Vietnamese forces received seldom mention, while Vietcong and PAVN losses were frequently exaggerated.

Reporters quickly began to refer to these daily briefings as the "Five O'Clock Follies" due to their inaccurate reported body counts, general atmosphere of confusion and numerous difficulties experienced in the presentation of the supposedly detailed information. Other issues and concerns with JUSPAO's briefings were numerous. The focus on American activities in South Vietnam essentially placed blinders on the press and public who rarely learned of allied operations. If maneuvers executed by the Army of the Republic of Vietnam (ARVN) did merit acknowledgment, it was often done so in a negative fashion. Another problem came from the inherent issue of words and phrases that the media and public expected such as "lines", "fronts", and "advances". The war, much of which was unconventional, rarely had any clearly defined "fronts" or "lines", excepting battles like the Siege of Khe Sanh. Yet the war was almost always described in conventional terms. The media also attempted to cover events in an episodic fashion, devoting time to the week's most intriguing battle, but the war rarely occurred in an episodic manner with actions taking place sporadically across South Vietnam. MACOI officials in charge of gathering information relied upon direct sources in the field that could often be inaccurate, incomplete, or simply unavailable. Additionally, the war was so complex and confusing that most reporters did not know what questions to ask, whereas those who did frequently skipped the briefings and pursued their own sources.

== Aftermath ==
JUSPAO operated in South Vietnam until 1972, but its general effectiveness is debated. During the war, many believed JUSPAO had an undeniable contribution to the American war effort. In the spring of 1966 Utah congressman David S. King touted the information program's merits in front of his colleagues on Capitol Hill. The congressman stated, "The real war however, is being fought not for the bodies but the minds of the Vietcong. The work of JUSPAO is no less significant because it receives so little recognition. In my opinion it is our ultimate weapon". Nevertheless, the typical consensus of the organization changed drastically following the American withdrawal. Even the former director Barry Zorthian questioned JUSPAO's success in Vietnam, further expounding on his thoughts by theorizing that the USIS has done little to learn from their mistakes since the 1970s. On the other hand, the Five O'clock Follies hosted by JUSPAO had an undeniable consequence on the war. During the American escalation in the late 1960s, the claims of victory presented in the briefings were taken at face value and rarely scrutinized. After the Tet Offensive, though, reporters lost faith in the official pronouncements released by JUSPAO and MACOI. Members of the media, including Michael Herr of Esquire, even treated the Five O'clock Follies as the U.S. Army's PSYOP program against the press and public. Instead of attending the Follies, Herr and many other journalists tracked down their own stories with soldiers in the field.
