= Media coverage of the Gulf War =

The Persian Gulf War (2 August 1990 – 28 February 1991), codenamed Operation Desert Storm (17 January 1991 – 28 February 1991) and commonly referred to as the Gulf War, was a war waged by a United Nations-authorized coalition force from 34 nations led by the United States against Iraq in response to Iraq's invasion and annexation of Kuwait. Media coverage of the Gulf War was significant for many reasons including CNN's live reporting from a Baghdad hotel, alternative and international coverage, and the use of images.

== U.S. television coverage and the CNN factor ==
The Persian Gulf War was a heavily televised war. New technologies, such as satellite technology, allowed for a new type of war coverage. The media also had access to military innovations, such as the imagery obtained from "camera-equipped high-tech weaponry directed against Iraqi targets", according to the Museum of Broadcast Communications. For the first time, people all over the world were able to watch live pictures of missiles hitting their targets and fighters taking off from aircraft carriers from the actual perspective of the machinery. The images of precise land bombing and use of night vision equipment gave the reporting a futuristic spin which was said to resemble video game imagery and encourage the "war drama". Because of the pool system, however, most television networks relied heavily on the information and imagery supplied by the military. This limited the media's ability to cover the war, despite those new technologies that created the potential for live coverage.

The war was covered live since its beginnings by the three main American networks, as well as the emerging CNN. On the night of January 16, when the air strikes began, ABC's Peter Jennings, CBS's Dan Rather, and NBC's Tom Brokaw were anchoring their evening newscasts. ABC News correspondent Gary Shepard, reporting live from Baghdad, told Jennings of the quietness of the city. But, moments later, Shepard was back on the air as flashes of light were seen on the horizon and tracer fire was heard on the ground. On CBS, viewers were watching a report from correspondent Allen Pizzey, who was also reporting from Baghdad, when the war began. On the NBC Nightly News, correspondent Mike Boettcher reported unusual air activity in Dhahran, Saudi Arabia. Moments later, Brokaw announced to his viewers that the air attack had begun.

However, it was CNN which gained the most popularity for their coverage, and indeed its wartime coverage is often cited as one of the landmark events in the development of the network. CNN was the only 24‑hour coverage news network and by the time the war began they had already been doing this type of coverage for 10 years. When the war broke out they already possessed the necessary equipment and personnel and were ready to follow events in Baghdad on a 24‑hour basis. "They had the reporters, satellite, linkups, the engineers, the producers and expert commentators in place or on standby". In addition when the government warned American journalists that their security might be put at risk because of the bombings, CNN's Baghdad correspondents Bernard Shaw, John Holliman, and Peter Arnett, as well as the rest of their team chose to stay behind. Furthermore, when the Iraqi authorities decided to expel the rest of the Western correspondents CNN's team was able to stay behind because producer Robert Winner had spent the last months trying to build cooperative relations with government officials in Baghdad. During the first days of the bombing the CNN team was able to report live via radio from their hotel suite in the Rashid Hotel, while no other network was able to do this. The CNN live coverage from the hotel was also significant since it was unedited. This event was a critical turn to the 24-hour news coverage. Out of the CNN correspondents the one who received the most attention was Peter Arnett who became known for the controversy of his reportages. His reports on the Coalition's POWs, on the bombing of what was claimed to be a milk factory by the Iraq authorities, and on the bombing of the bunker outside Bagdad where nearly 400 civilians were killed, were particularly controversial and resulted in him being titled as anti-patriotic by some.

Media and television reporting during the first Gulf War received criticism. Columbia University professor Douglas Kellner argued that the media framed the war as an exciting narrative – turning it into a dramatic, patriotic spectacle – and that the anchors of the major American TV networks such as CBS presented a view that seemed to identify solely with the American military. In the book The Persian Gulf TV War, he argued that television networks and other media did not provide a balanced account of the events because this did not further the business interests of commercial networks.

"I watched with horror and amazement CNN's coverage of the Gulf conflict," observed musician Roger Waters, who references the war on his 1992 album Amused to Death. "And I've viewed with mounting disgust the way in which they have built his (Ted Turner's) empire on that; their finest hour."

General Norman Schwarzkopf referred to the driver of a vehicle in a news conference during Gulf War on January 30, 1991 as, "the luckiest man in Iraq". He showed a video of a laser-guided bomb destroying a bridge just after the vehicle had driven over it.

== International coverage ==
In the United Kingdom, the BBC devoted the FM portion of its national speech radio station BBC Radio 4 to an 18-hour rolling news format creating Radio 4 News FM. The station was short lived, ending shortly after President Bush declared the ceasefire and the liberation of Kuwait. However, it paved the way for the later introduction of BBC Radio 5 Live.

Two BBC journalists, John Simpson and Bob Simpson (no relation), defied their editors and remained in Baghdad to report on the progress of the war. They were responsible for a report which included an "infamous cruise missile that travelled down a street and turned left at a traffic light."

On February 24, 1991, Queen Elizabeth II gave an address to the UK on the war, having consulted with Prime Minister John Major and government ministers. This was the first time the Queen had spoken in a televised address in addition to her annual Christmas message.

Newspapers all over the world also covered the war and Time magazine published a special issue dated 28 January 1991, the headline "WAR IN THE GULF" emblazoned on the cover over a picture of Baghdad taken as the war began.

U.S. policy regarding media freedom was much more restrictive than in the Vietnam War. The policy had been spelled out in a Pentagon document entitled Annex Foxtrot. Most of the press information came from briefings organized by the military. Only selected journalists were allowed to visit the front lines or conduct interviews with soldiers. Those visits were always conducted in the presence of officers, and were subject to both prior approval by the military and censorship afterward. This was ostensibly to protect sensitive information from being revealed to Iraq. This policy was heavily influenced by the military's experience with the Vietnam War, in which public opposition within the United States grew throughout the course of the war. It wasn't only the limiting of information in the Middle East, media were also restricting what was shown about the war with more graphic depictions like Ken Jarecke's image of a burnt Iraqi soldier being pulled from the American AP wire whereas in Europe it was given extensive coverage.

At the same time, the coverage of this war was new in its instantaneousness. About halfway through the war, Iraq's government decided to allow live satellite transmissions from the country by Western news organizations, and U.S. journalists returned en masse to Baghdad. Tom Aspell of NBC, Bill Blakemore of ABC, and Betsy Aaron of CBS News filed reports, subject to acknowledged Iraqi censorship. Throughout the war, footage of incoming missiles was broadcast almost immediately.

A British crew from CBS News (David Green and Andy Thompson), equipped with satellite transmission equipment traveled with the front line forces and, having transmitted live TV pictures of the fighting en route, arrived the day before the forces in Kuwait City, broadcasting live television from the city and covering the entrance of the Arab forces the following day.

=== Middle East media and audiences ===
Arab media industry was strictly controlled by governments. State-owned TV stations were also being supervised. As the mouthpiece of the authority, Ab news media only broadcast what the government wanted the public to know. News in this context is called "protocol news", reporting war information closely following the government agenda. Witnessing the significant influence of CNN's Gulf War coverage, Arab states realized how satellite television reporting could grant a country considerable leverage during war times. Witnessing the dramatic impact of CNN's international coverage of the 1991 Gulf War, several Arab states realized the strategic value of satellite television during times of conflict. Many of the Gulf States began launching their own national satellite TV networks. Arab governments saw satellite news as the ideal vehicle for extending and exerting influence beyond their own borders. The success of CNN among Arab audiences during the Gulf War led to the establishment of the Middle East Broadcasting Center (MBC) in London. Events such as the Gulf war and the 2003 invasion of Iraq created major realignments in Saudi social and political boundaries.

== Alternative media coverage ==
Alternative media outlets provided views in opposition to the Gulf War. Deep Dish Television in collaboration with Paper Tiger Television its sister organization, compiled segments from independent producers in the U.S. and abroad, and produced a ten-hour series that was distributed internationally, called "The Gulf Crisis TV Project". The first program of this series "War, Oil and Power" was compiled and released in 1990, before the war broke out. "News World Order" was the title of another program in the series; it focused on the complicity of the media in promoting the war, as well as Americans' reactions to the media coverage. In San Francisco, as a local example, Paper Tiger Television West produced a weekly cable television show with highlights of mass demonstrations, artists' actions, lectures, and protests against mainstream media coverage at newspaper offices and television stations. Local media outlets in cities across the country screened similar oppositional media.

The organization Fairness and Accuracy in Reporting (FAIR) critically analyzed media coverage during the Gulf War in various articles and books, such as the 1991 Gulf War Coverage: The Worst Censorship was at Home.

== Government communication ==
Although a short war, communication from the administration during the Gulf War was significant. Learning lessons from the television coverage of the Vietnam War, the Pentagon strategically communicated the Gulf War to the American public by placing certain restrictions on press coverage. Select journalists were allowed to visit the front lines in "press pools." These reporters had to be accompanied by U.S. military. The military's communication policy regarding Operation Desert Storm were disclosed in a 10-page document entitled the Annex Foxtrot, drafted by Captain Ron Wildermuth, the chief aide for public affairs. This was the first conflict in which reporters had to be escorted by military officials called the Department of Defense National Media Pool. Officials claimed national security and classifying information from the enemy as reason for these new policies. Defense Secretary Dick Cheney was primarily responsible for the oversight of these press restrictions, and modeled the restrictions after the press blackout during the invasion of Panama in 1989.

The Pentagon televised daily briefings primarily conducted by Lieutenant General Thomas Kelley. White House Chief of Staff John Sununu said the only time information was withheld was when it threatened national security.

The press did attempt to fight back to the administration's access policies during the Gulf War. Bureau chiefs from print and television collaborated on a letter to President Bush communicating concerns about the restrictions in Saudi Arabia particularly. Ted Koppel, host of ABC's "Nightline" criticized the administration's policies stating, "I'm not sure the public's interest is served by seeing what seems to have been such a painless war, when 50,000 to 100,000 people may have died on the other side."

== See also ==
- United States news media and the Vietnam War
- Media coverage of the Iraq War
