= International Climate Change Partnership =

The International Climate Change Partnership (ICCP) is an organization of oil and chemical companies and trade associations from around the world working to influence international climate change legislation.

== History ==
The association began from mainly former businesses that had participated in the negotiations of the Montreal Protocol. In the mid-1990s the ICCP was the first major business coalition organization to advocate for market mechanisms as part of what would become the Kyoto Protocol. Although it did not advocate for carbon limits, the ICCP broke from traditional anti-regulatory business coalitions as a pro-regulatory coalition. This allowed the trade association to outcompete other businesses in promoting the coalition's preferred agenda in climate change policy formulation in the First Conference of Parties to the United Nations Framework Convention on Climate Change in 1995. The ICCP preferred an emissions trading scheme over a carbon tax.

== See also ==
- Politics of global warming
