= Rex Hotel =

Luxury hotel in Ho Chi Minh City, Vietnam

Rex Hotel Saigon
- Khách sạn Rex Sài Gòn; Khách sạn Bến Thành
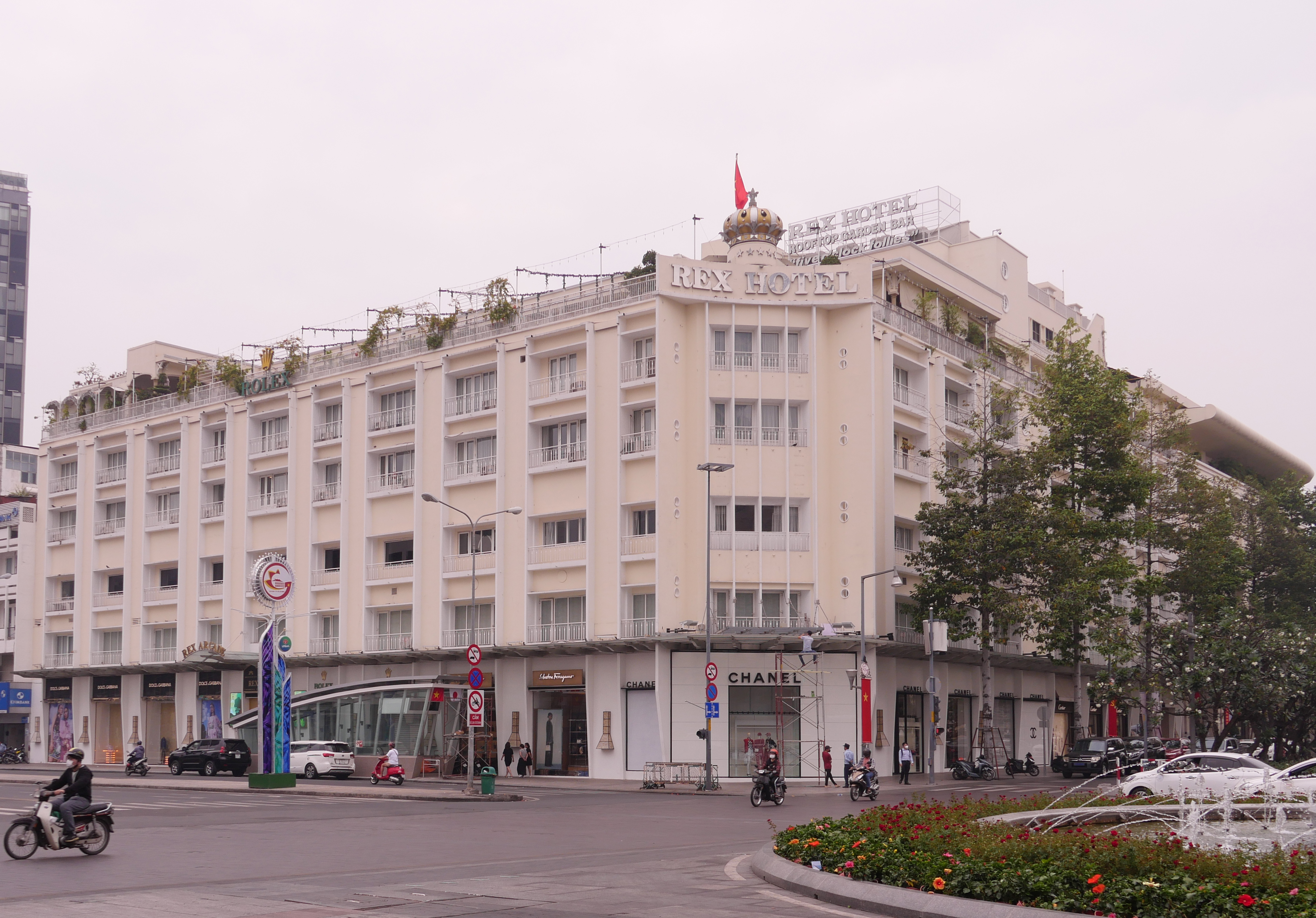
- Rex Hotel in 2023
- Former names: Bainier Auto Hall; Rex Complex (Thương xá Rex)
- Alternative names: Rex Arcade (boutique mall)

General information
- Type: Hotel, shopping mall (Ground floor)
- Classification: 5 stars
- Location: Hotel entrance: 141 Nguyễn Huệ Boulevard and 77 Lê Thánh Tôn Street; Rex Arcade entrace: 4–6 Lê Lợi Boulevard, Saigon, Ho Chi Minh City
- Coordinates: 10°46′33″N 106°42′5.4″E
- Opened: 1927; 99 years ago: Bainier Auto Hall; 1959; 67 years ago: Rex Complex; June 1976; 50 years ago: Bến Thành Hotel
- Renovated: 2003
- Operator: Saigontourist

Technical details
- Floor count: 6

Other information
- Number of rooms: 286
- Number of restaurants: 5
- Parking: 2 basements
- Public transit: L1 Opera House station

Website
- www.rexhotelsaigon.com

The Rex Hotel or Rex Hotel Saigon (Vietnamese: Khách Sạn Rex, French: Hôtel Rex de Saïgon) is a famous luxury and business hotel in Ho Chi Minh City, Vietnam. During the Vietnam War, the daily U.S. briefings at the hotel became known as "The Five O'Clock Follies".

The 286-room six-story building (as of 2024) is located on the corner of Lê Lợi Boulevard and Nguyễn Huệ Boulevard in District 1, central district of the city.

== History ==
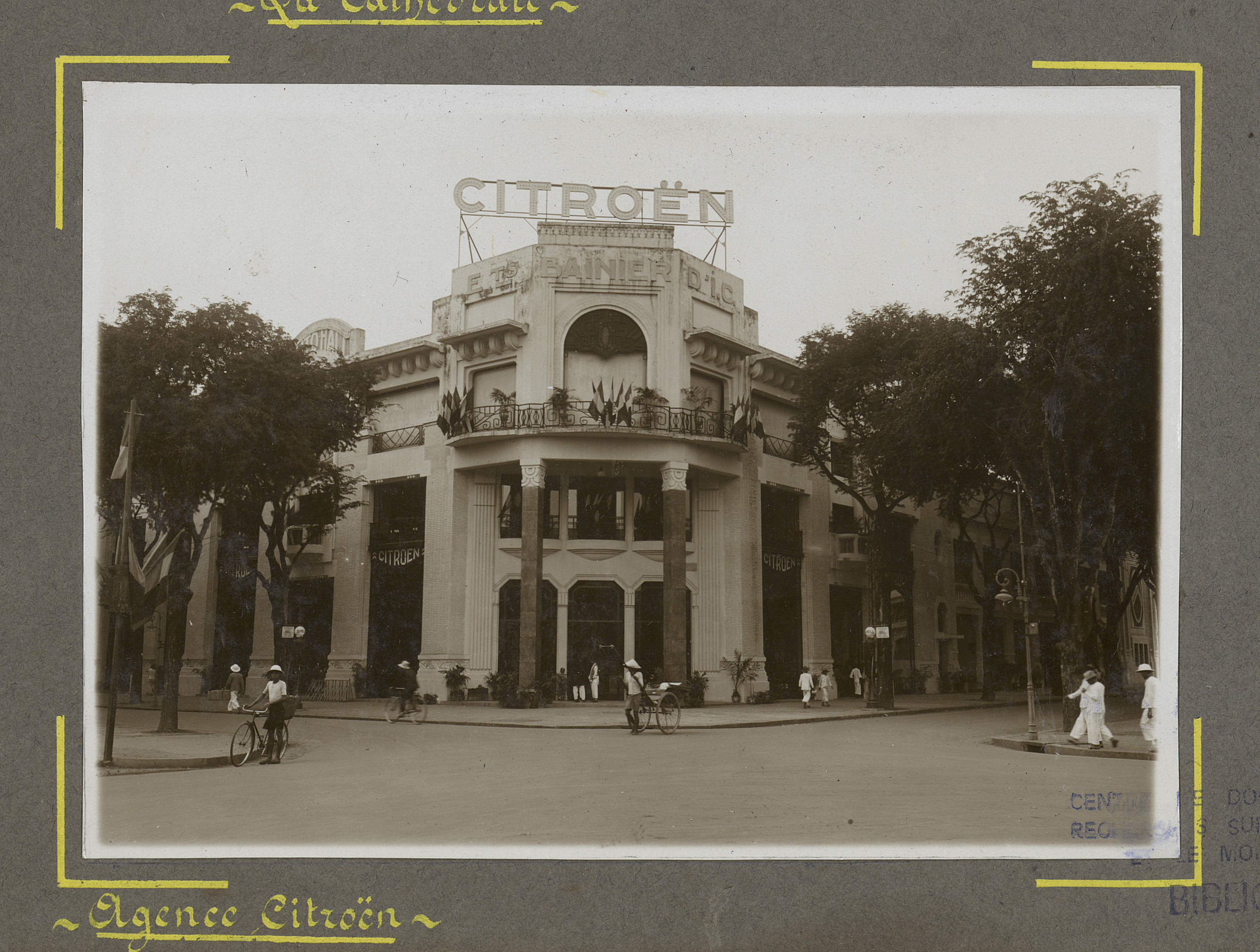
Citroën garage in 1930.

Constructed in 1927, for French businessman Bainier, during France's colonial rule of Vietnam, the building started out as a two-story auto dealership and garage complex, called Bainier Auto Hall. The building showcased Citroën and other European cars.

From 1959 to 1975, Mr. and Mrs. Ưng Thi renovated the building into the 100-room Rex Complex hotel, which featured three cinemas, a cafeteria, a dance hall and a library. The cinema was adorned with the most developed technology at the time, such as high-speed air conditioning, a 150-square-meter Todd-AO screen, and a stereo sound system to indulge up to 1,200 customers.

=== Vietnam War ===
In 1960, the building was leased by the American Culture Centre and at that time the Abraham Lincoln Library was established on the building’s ground floor.

The first guests in the Rex came in 1961, while it was still in its final construction phase. They were 400 U.S. Army soldiers.

The hotel was the site of the United States military command's daily press conference, derisively named Five O'Clock Follies by cynical journalists who found the optimism of the American officers misguided. The daily event was hosted by Barry Zorthian, chief spokesperson for the U. S. government in Saigon from 1964-68. In these briefings, United States, South Vietnamese military and civilian press officers would give a breakdown of the day’s hostilities, casualties and alleged successes.

Its rooftop bar was a well-known hangout spot for military officials and war correspondents.

At its height in the late 1960s, the Rex complex had around 600 employees and was frequented regularly by over 450 international journalists covering the US war effort.

=== 1975 to present ===
After the Fall of Saigon, the state's Saigon Tourism Bureau took ownership of the hotel and renamed it Bến Thành Hotel in 1976. In 1986, the hotel was renamed as Rex Hotel, the name Bến Thành still kept as legal entity name and used along with the original name.

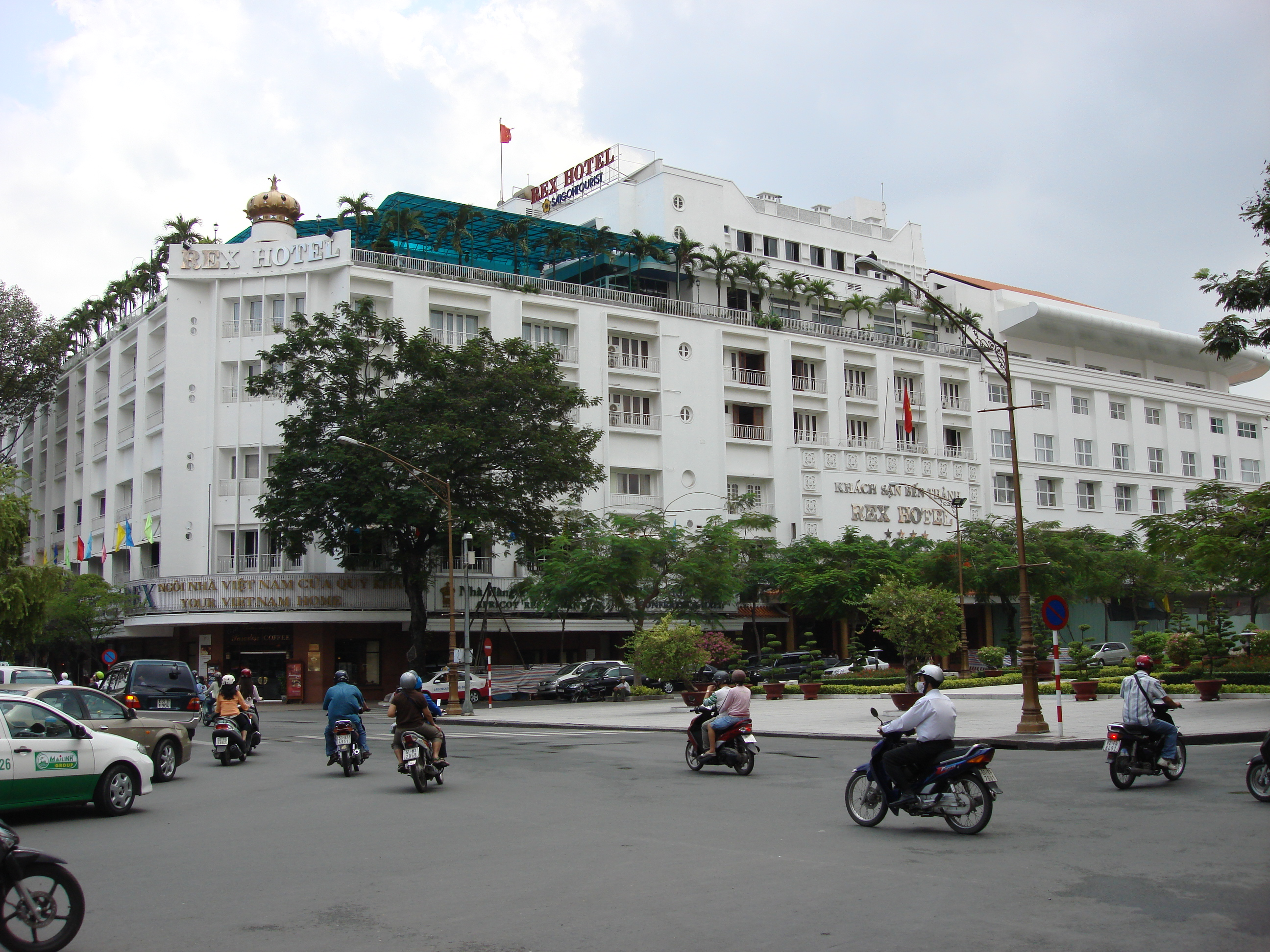
Rex Hotel in 2008 when it is recognized as a 4-star hotel and the official Vietnamese name "Khách sạn Bến Thành" still on the welcome gate

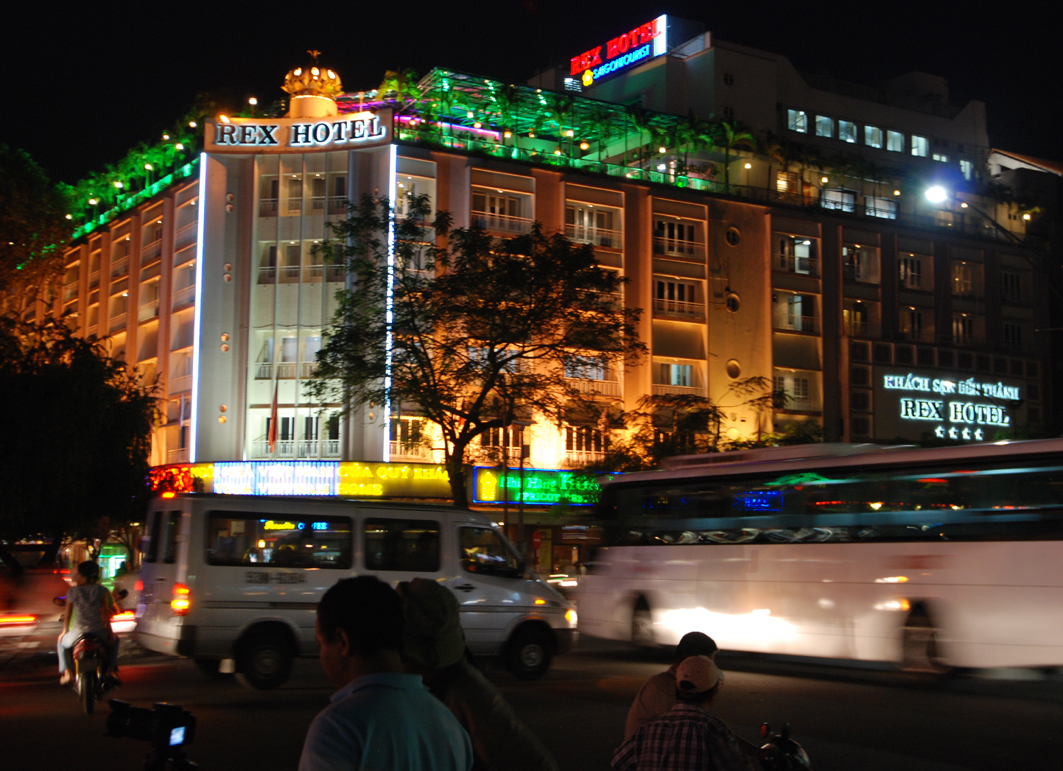
Rex Hotel at night in 2008

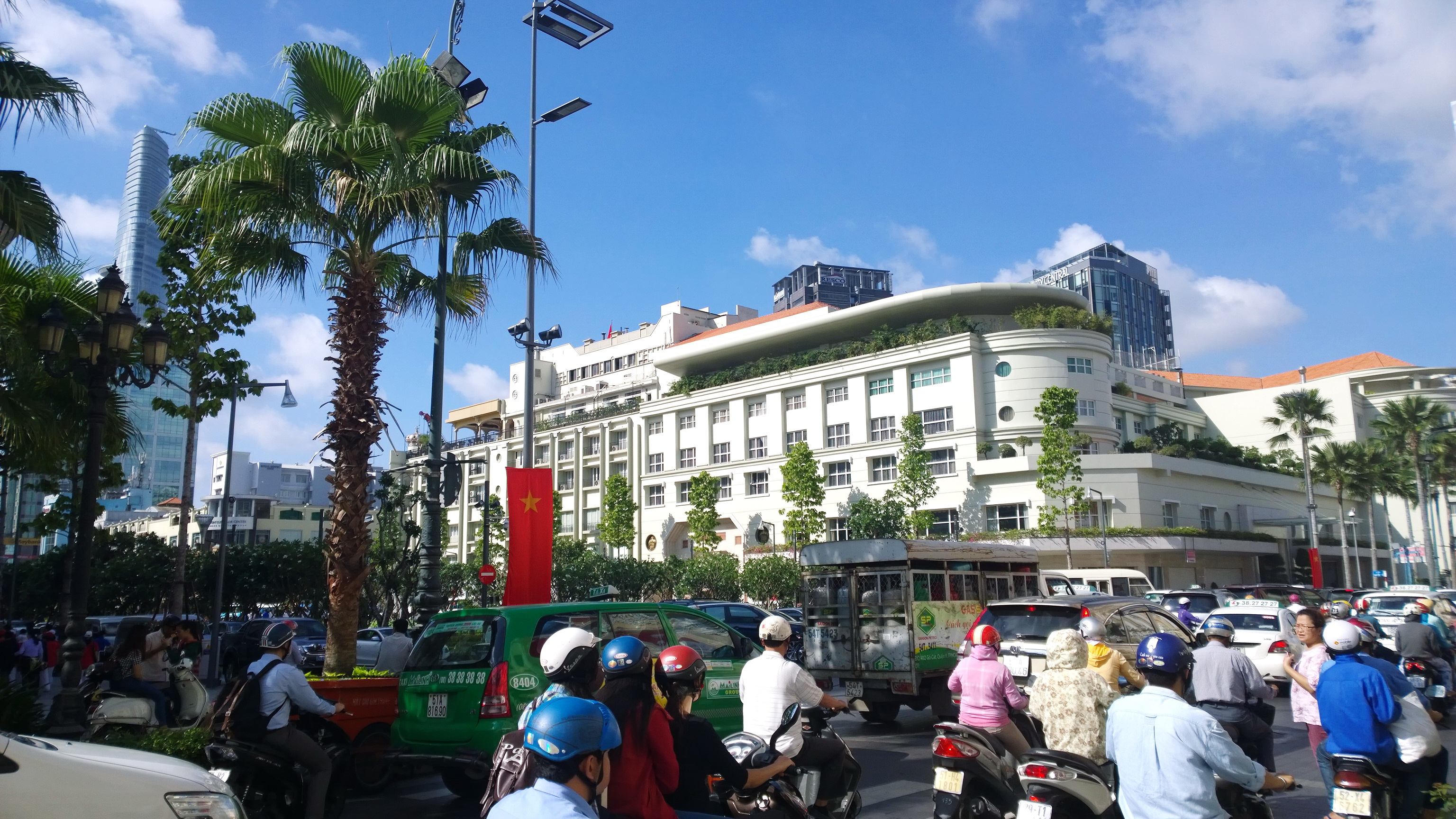
Rex Hotel on the corner of Lê Thánh Tôn – Nguyễn Huệ, viewed from Ho Chi Minh City Hall

In 2003, the hotel underwent extension and renovation works in its architecture, interior design and engineering services. It is owned by the state-owned enterprise Saigontourist.

== Rex Arcade ==
Rex Arcade entrance on Lê Lợi Blvd

Rex Arcade or Rex Shopping Arcade is an over 2,000 m^{2} (21,528 sq ft) luxury shopping center in the Ground Floor of the hotel (from the IPPG website), spans over three streets of Lê Thánh Tôn – Nguyễn Huệ – Lê Lợi, the area was the Abraham Lincoln Library. The Imex Pan Pacific Group (IPPG; Tập đoàn Liên Thái Bình Dương) of Jonathan Hạnh Nguyễn[vi] and his ex-actress spouse Lê Hồng Thủy Tiên[vi] has made a US$25,000,000 investment for the renovation of this area in a shopping center, it gathers some boutiques of high-end fashion brands, including these names in currently: Balmain, Burberry, Chanel, Christian Louboutin, Dolce & Gabbana, Ferragamo, Jacqueline, Paul & Shark, Rolex, Runway, Versace. Duy Anh Fashion & Cosmetics JSC (DAFC), a subsidiary of IPPG is responsible to be the official retailer of this shopping space. Currency exchange counter is located at the main lobby with some ATMs are also installed inside the Rex Arcade. The Vertu Rex Saigon Hotel Store is also located here.

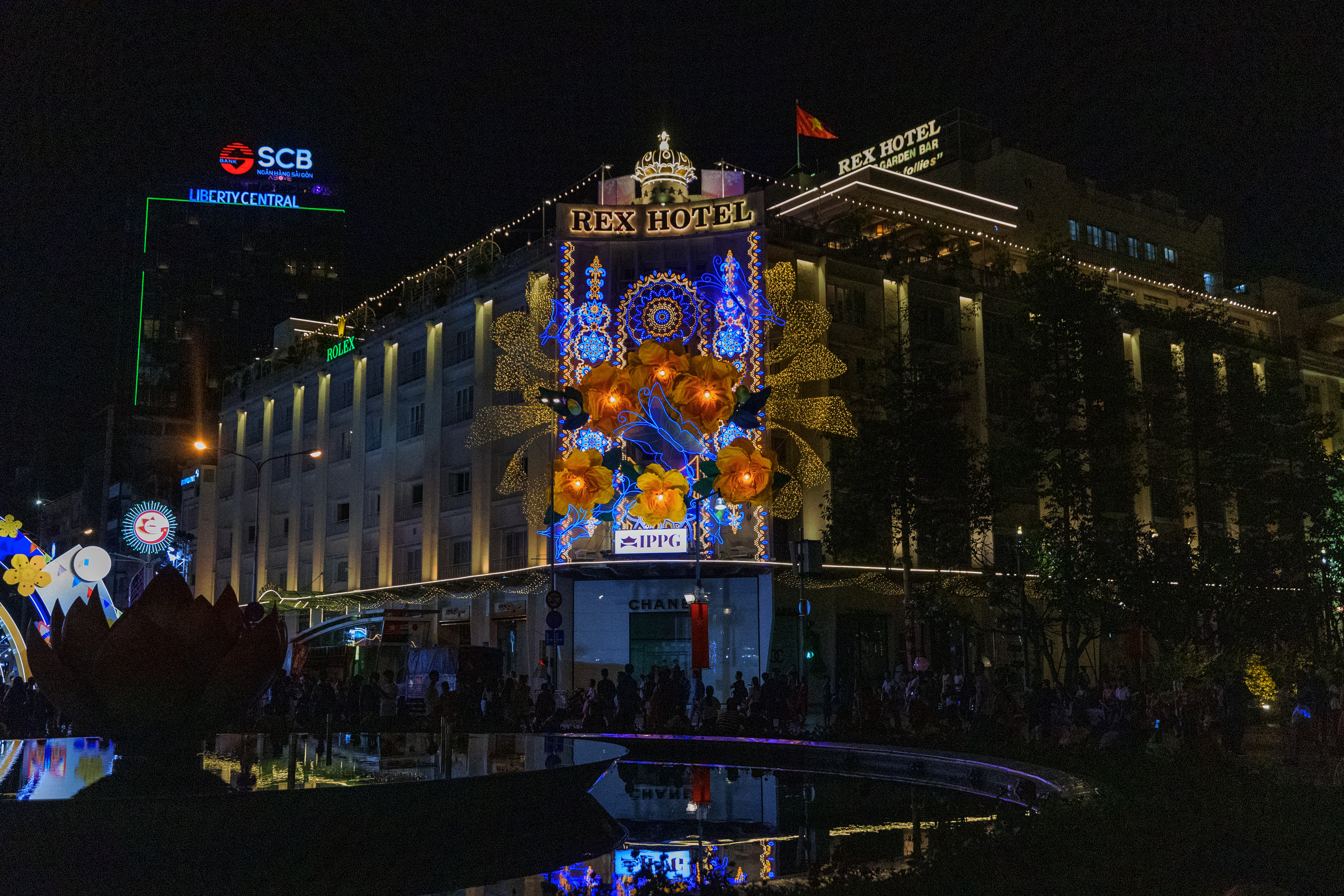
Rex Hotel was decorated for 2023 Lunar New Year with the logo of IPPG on the hotel eaves

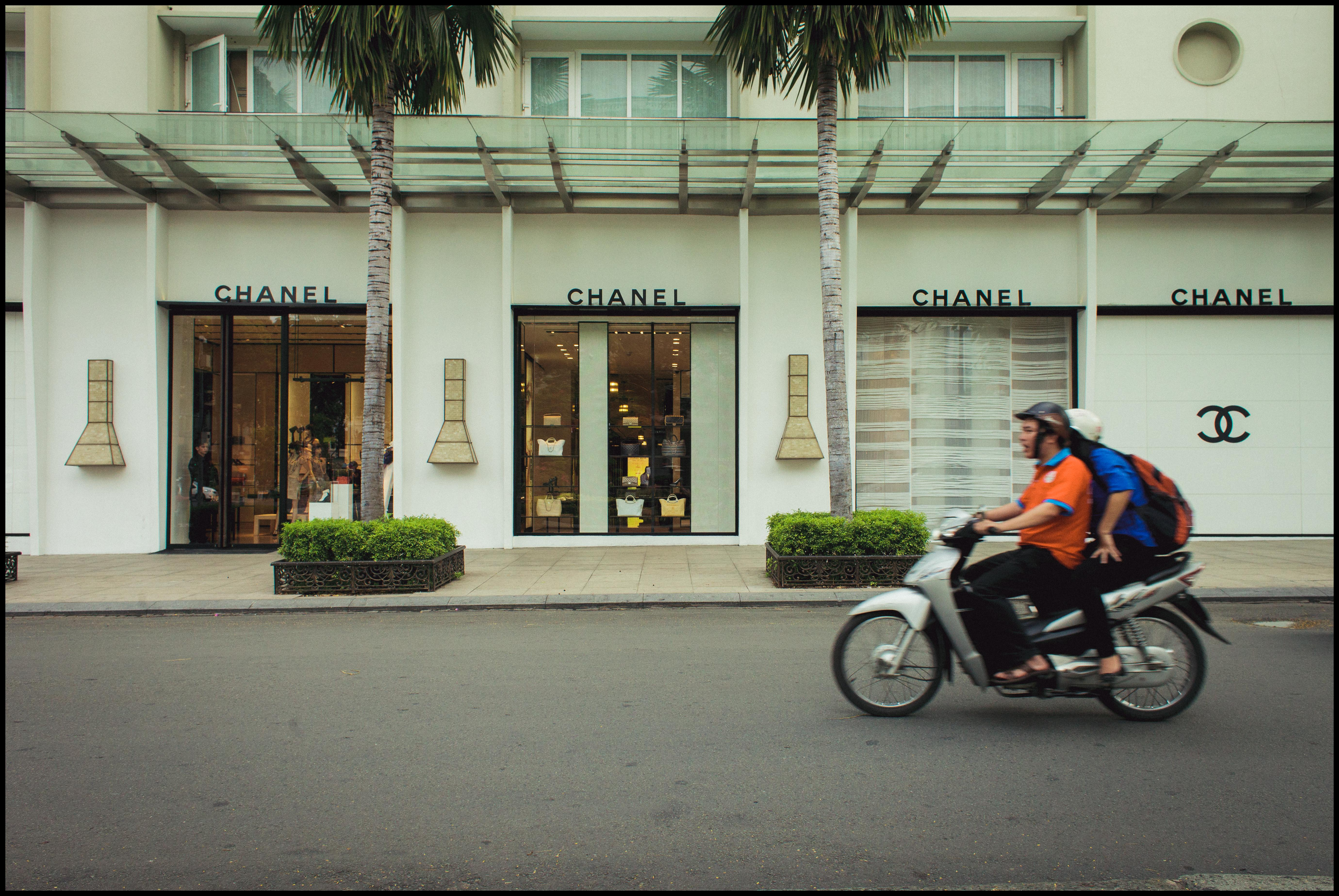
Chanel boutique at Rex Hotel on Nguyễn Huệ Blvd

Cartier boutique next to Chanel in 2011, then replaced by Rolex in 2024

Burberry boutique

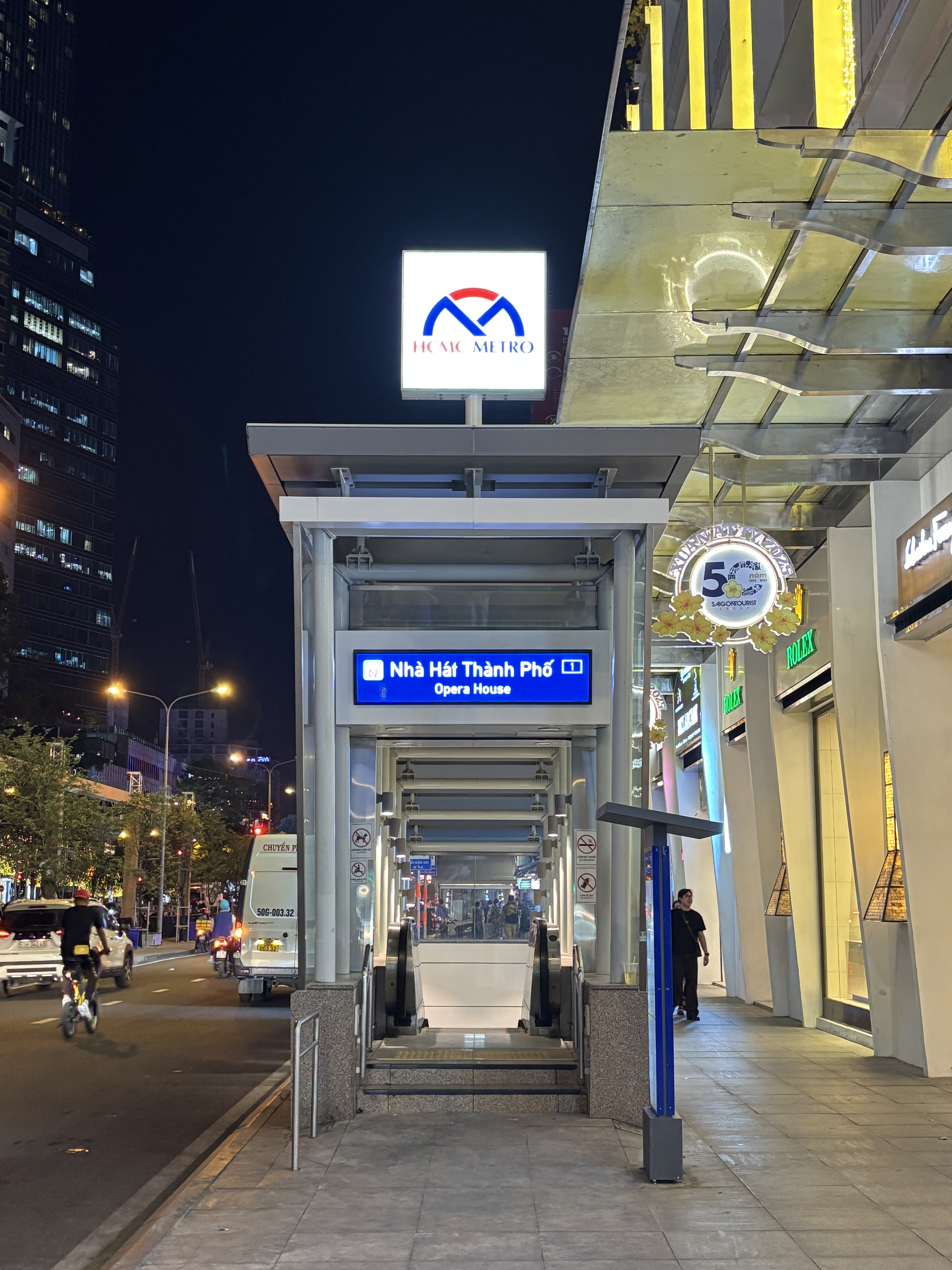
Entrance 1 of Opera House Station on HCMC Metro Line 1 on Lê Lợi Blvd next to the Rex Arcade entrance with boutiques of Rolex, Ferragamo

== Gallery ==
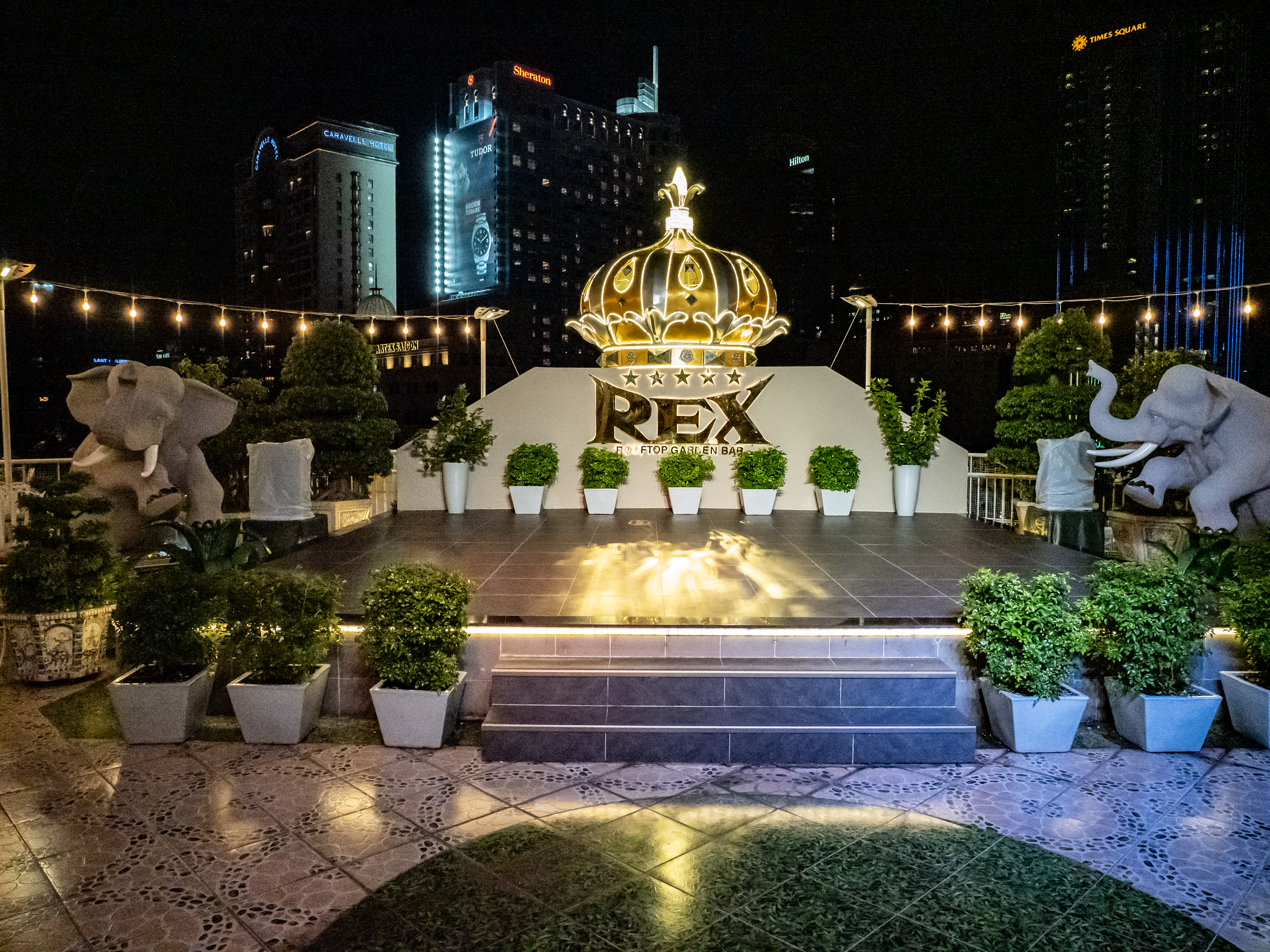
Rex Hotel rooftop bar

Rex Hotel in 2013 Festive season

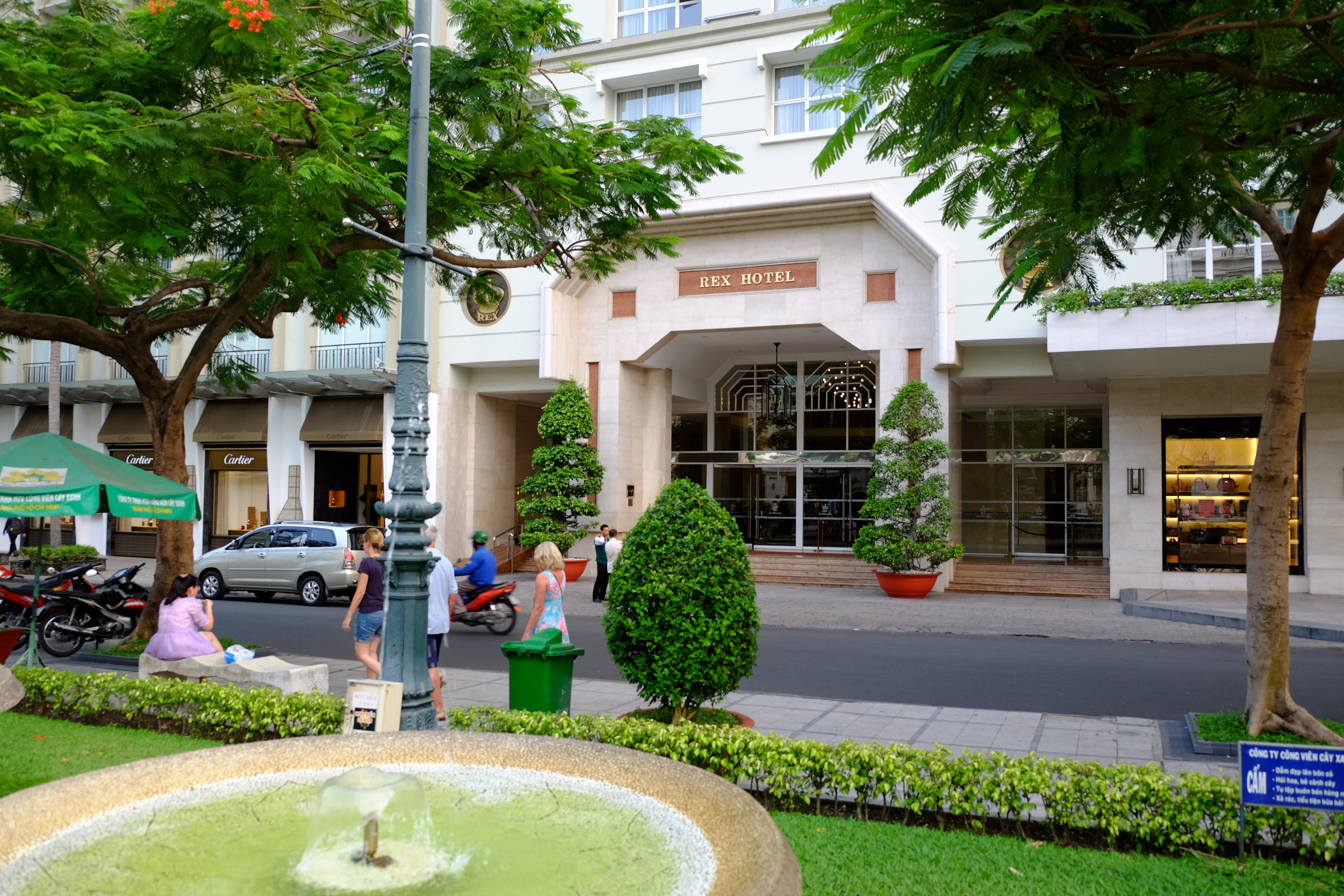
Rex Hotel main entrance on Nguyễn Huệ Boulevard

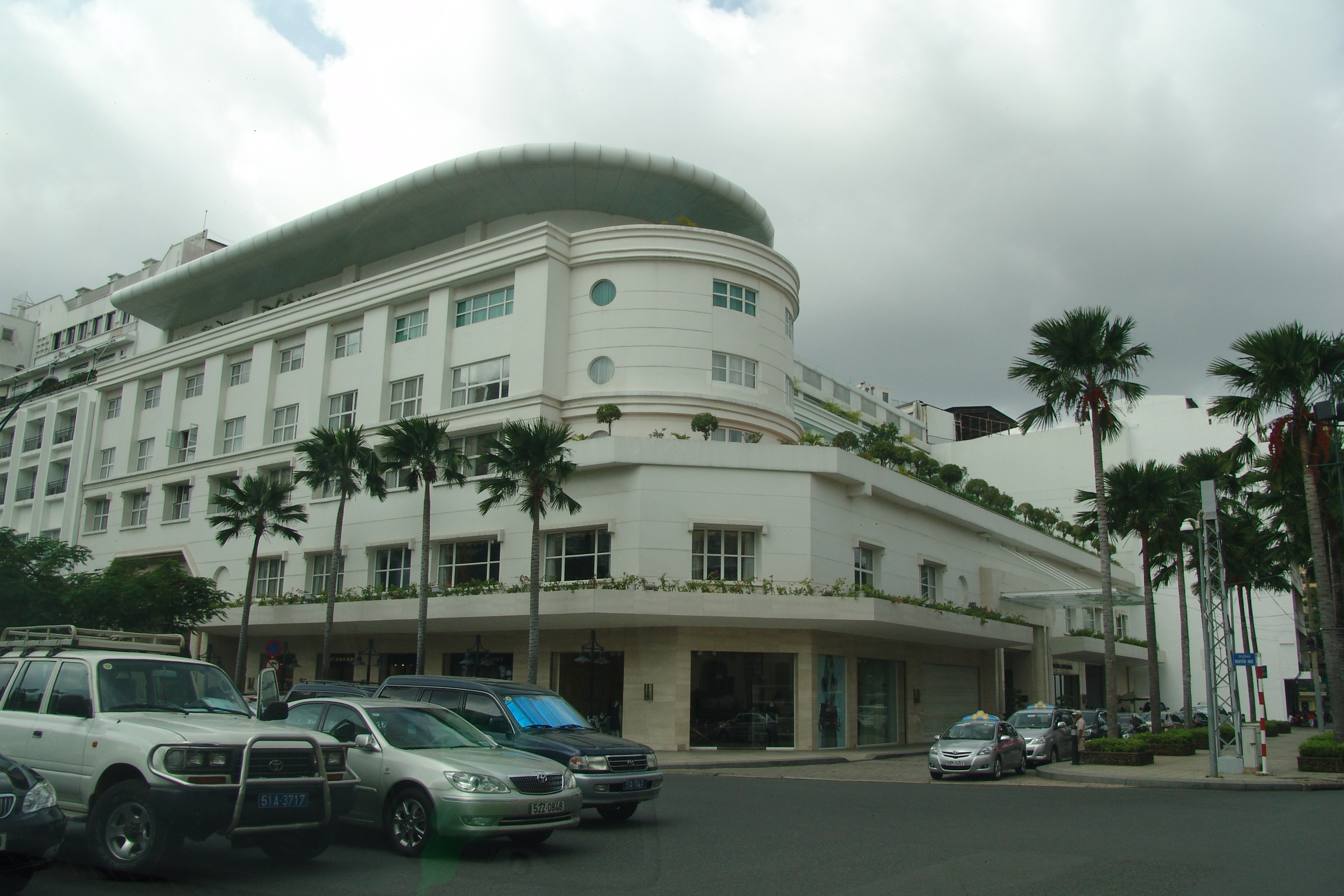
Rex Hotel at corner of Nguyễn Huệ and Lê Thánh Tôn in 2011

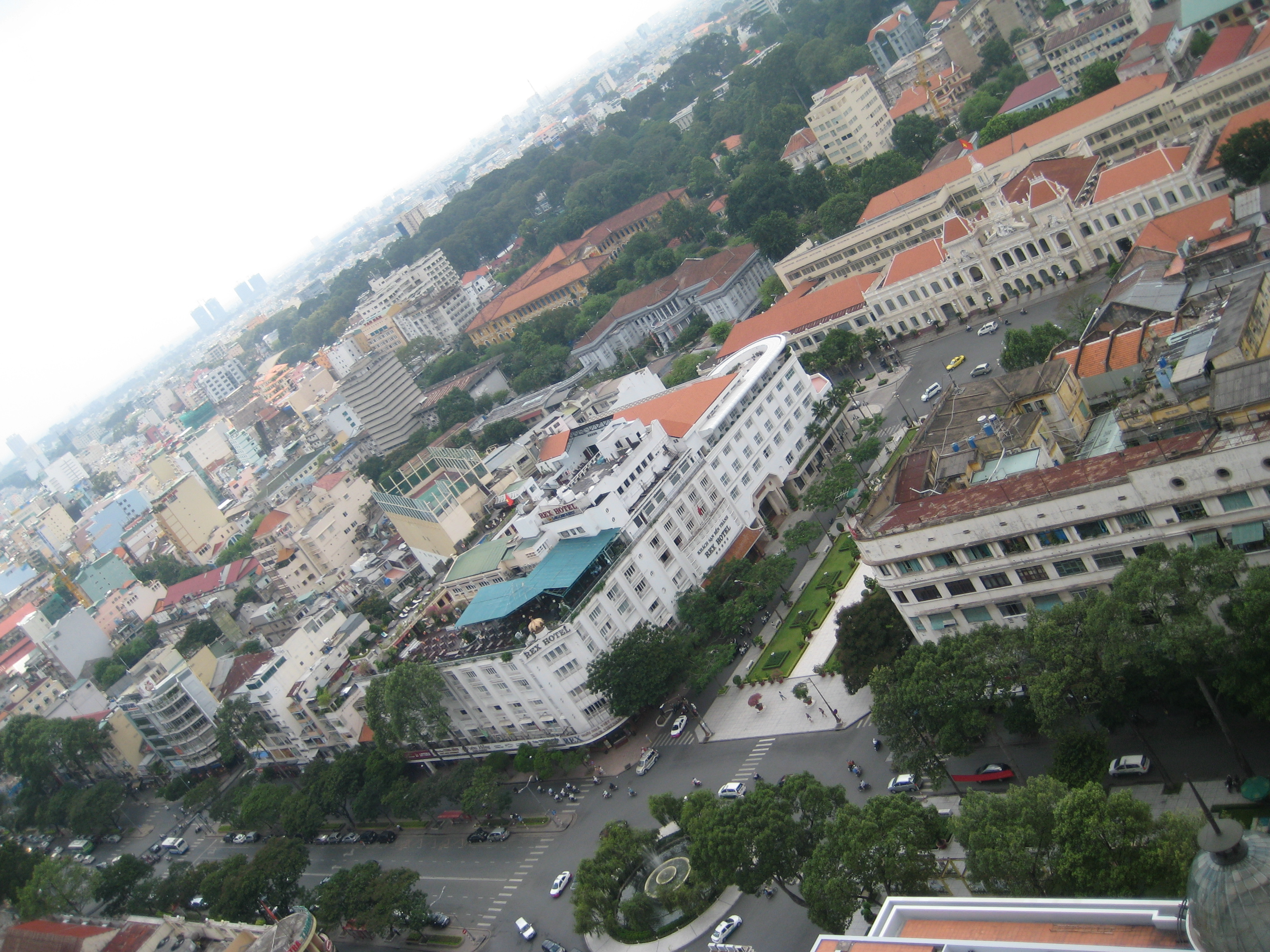
Rex Hotel viewed from 23th floor of Sheraton Saigon Grand Opera Hotel

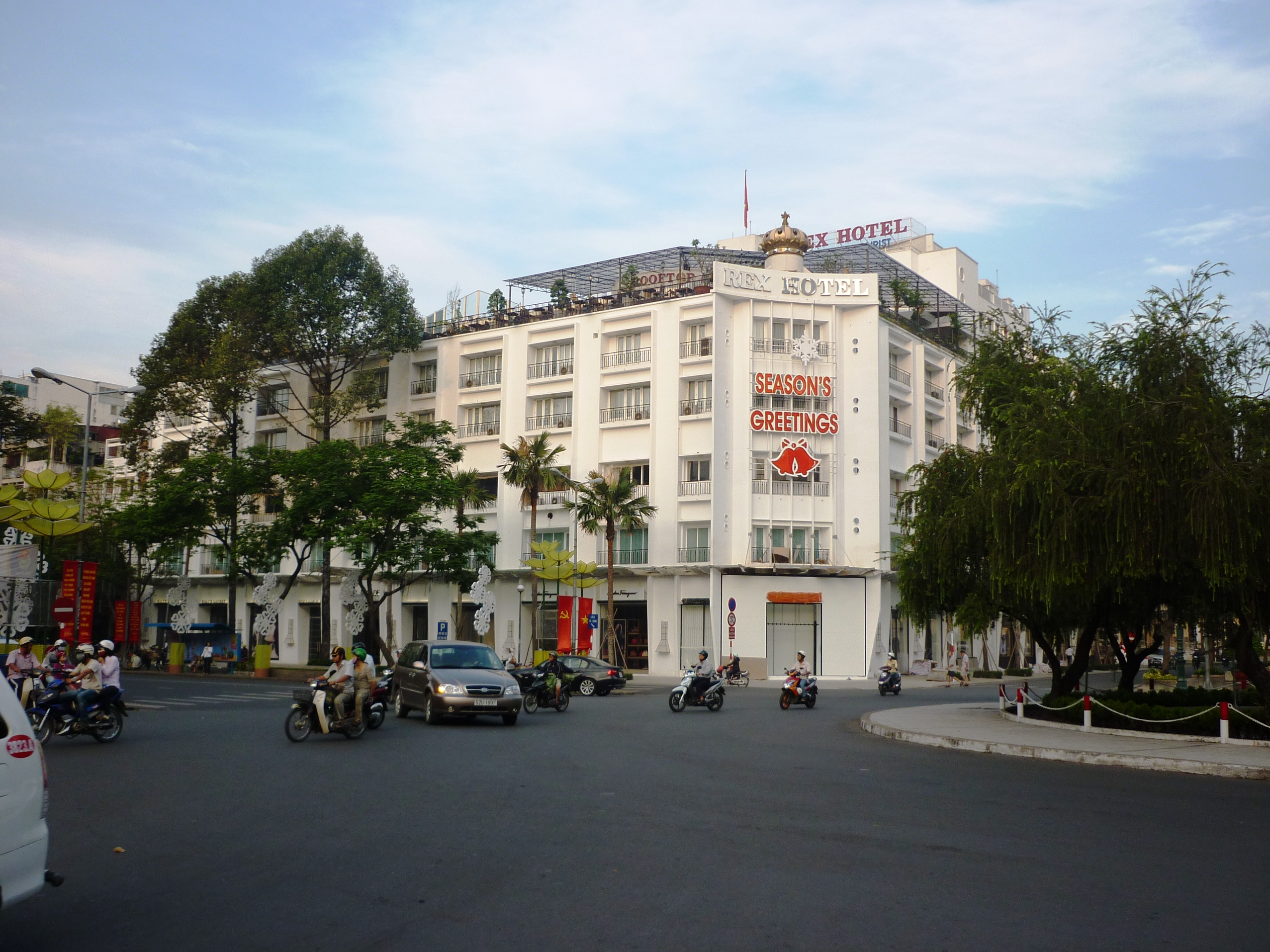
Rex Hotel decorated for Christmas season

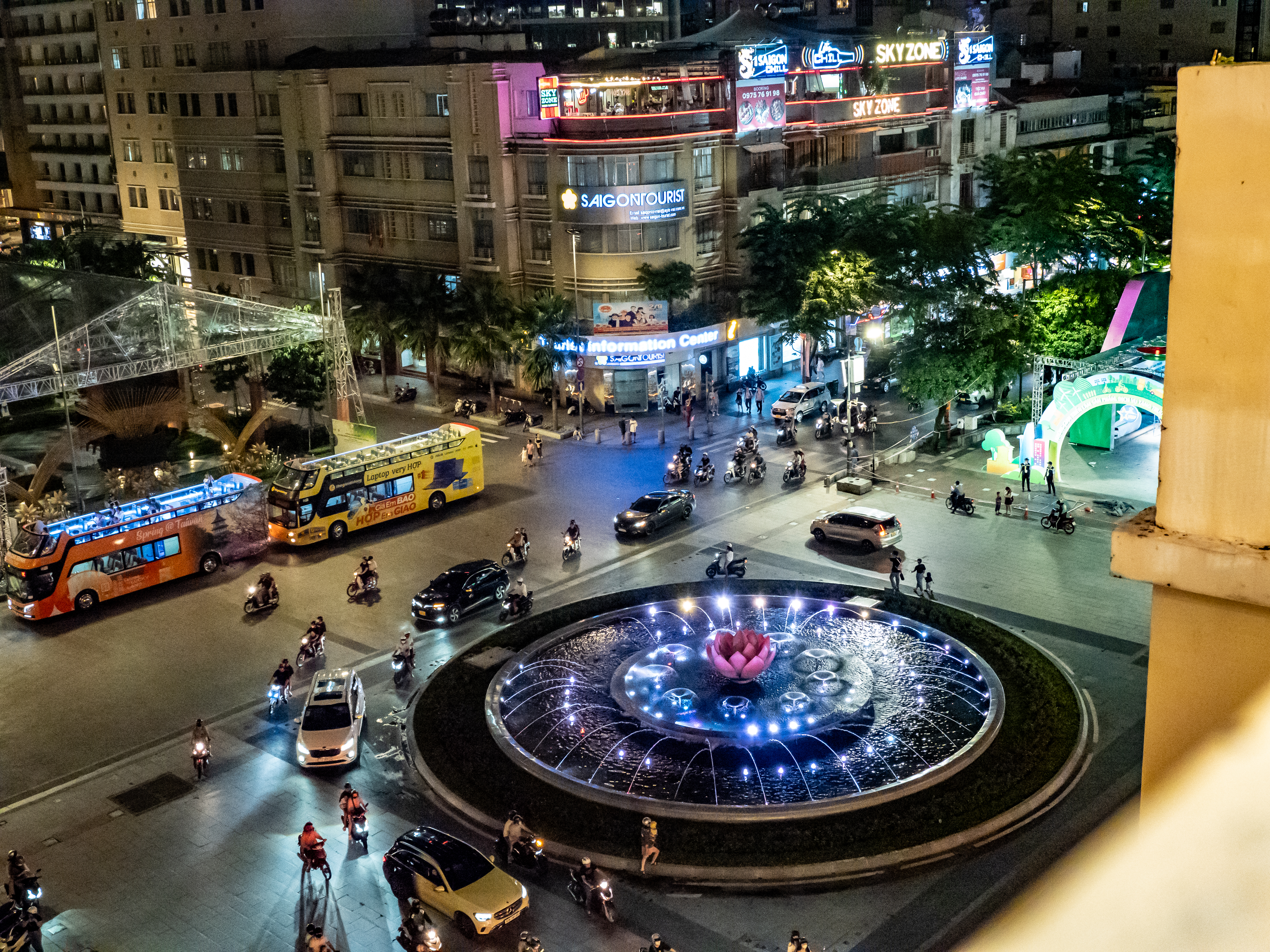
Nguyễn Huệ – Lê Lợi intersection view from Rex Hotel

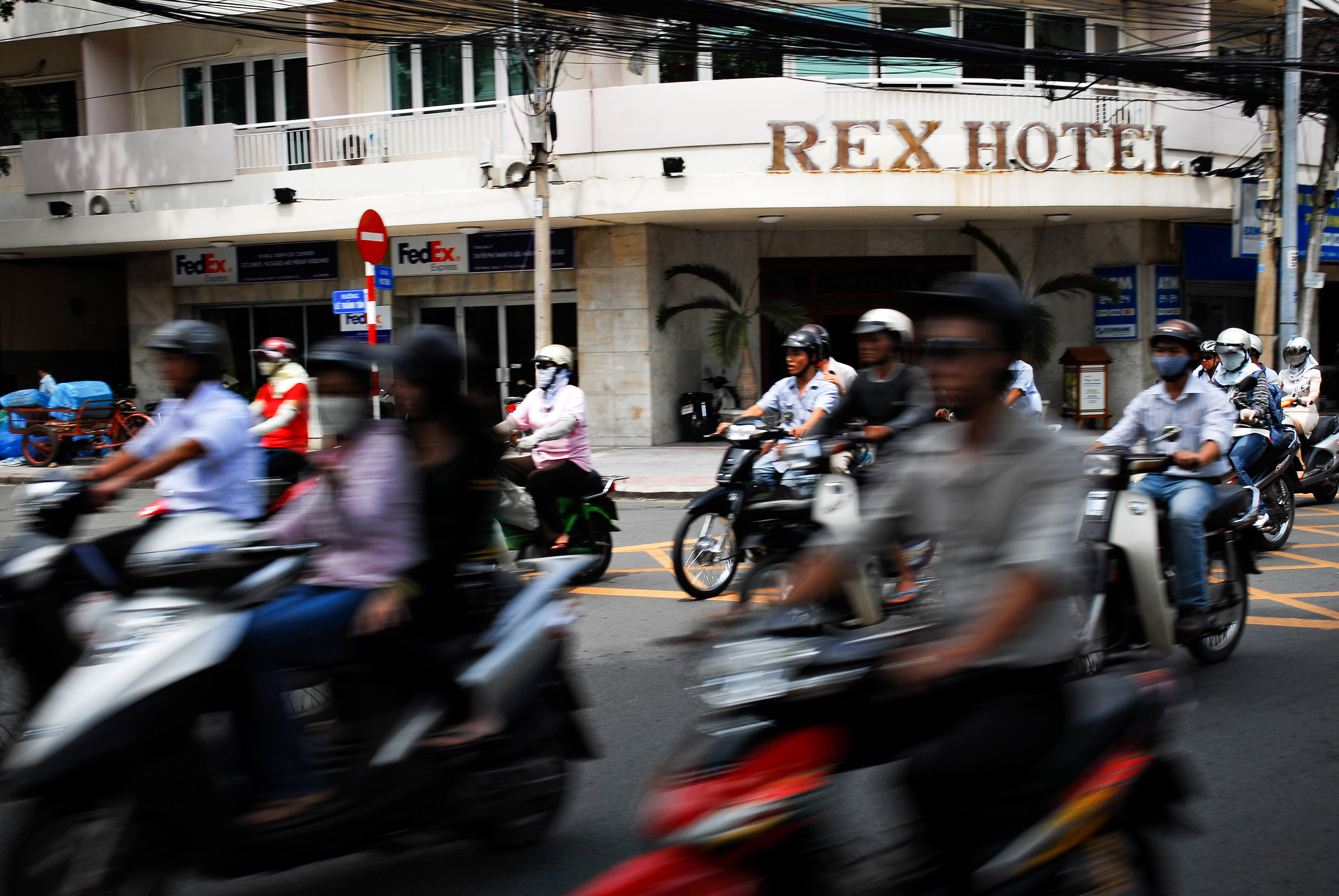
Rex Hotel with FedEx office in 2009 on

Rex Hotel in 2007 with its motto

== See also ==
- Hotel Metropole Hanoi
- Hotel Continental Saigon
- Hotel Majestic
