= Barry Zorthian =

American diplomat (1920-2010)

Barry Zorthian (1920–2010) was an American diplomat, most notably press officer for 4 1/2 years during the Vietnam War, media executive and lobbyist.

== Early life and education ==
Zorthian was born Baryoor Zorthian on October 8, 1920, in Kütahya, Turkey, the child of Armenian parents. According to his obituary in the New York Times: "His father, a writer, was imprisoned by Turks at a time when Armenians were being massacred, but he escaped. His mother, refusing to give the authorities information about her husband, was jailed for a time along with the newborn Baryoor. The family eventually reunited and fled to Greece and Italy. They settled in New Haven, where Mr. Zorthian’s father found work as a pants presser. Mr. Zorthian went to Yale, where he was an editor of The Yale Daily News and a member of the secret campus society Skull and Bones."

== Career ==
=== Military service and early career ===
Zorthian served with the Marines in the Pacific during World War II. After working for a St. Johnsbury, Vermont newspaper, the Caledonian Record, he joined CBS Radio and then the Voice of America (VOA). He earned a law degree from New York University, attended at night." In 1948 he covered the Korean War as one of VOA's first overseas correspondents. Later, he was a co-author of the VOA Charter, which persists to this day, and served as program director. In the last role, he launched several programming initiatives which were still on the air more than a half century later. Also at VOA, in response to a proposal from director Henry Loomis, Zorthian helped develop a Special English broadcasting capacity with slower word rate and limited vocabulary for non-English speakers. It was launched in 1959 and proved successful, according to a 2012 VOA review. After 13 years at VOA, Zorthian became a diplomat in India.

=== Service in South Vietnam ===
Zorthian was best known for his four years as chief spokesperson for the U. S. government in Saigon, South Vietnam from 1964-68. "His daily afternoon briefings for press correspondents ... were dubbed "Five O'Clock Follies" by reporters frustrated by the lack of complete transparency. ... New York Times Correspondent, Gloria Emerson, declared him 'a determined and brilliant liar' at a 1981 conference on the Vietnam War. Despite the criticism, many still trusted him as an honest public official. 'He had a conscience. He believed in informing the American public,' Neil Sheehan, a Pulitzer Prize-winning author and a former New York Times reporter in Saigon, told the Washington Post. 'His problem was that he was trying to sell a bad war.'" He was "Murrow's last recommendation before retiring from USIA, [an appointment] so sensitive that it required President Lyndon Johnson and the secretaries of state and defence, Dean Rusk and Robert McNamara, to sign off on it." He oversaw the 500-person Joint United States Public Affairs Office under Carl T. Rowan after Murrow retired. Other journalists he faced were members "of a tough school in American journalism covering the war" including Richard Pyle, David Halberstam, R.W. 'Johnny' Apple Jr., Peter Arnett, Bernard Kalb and Stanley Karnow -- "several of [them] made their reputations in Vietnam."

One obituary described his job in Saigon as trying to "defuse an increasingly acrimonious relationship between American officials and news correspondents covering the war[. He] used a mixture of charm, sly wit and uncommonly straight talk in trying to establish credibility for the U.S. effort.... [H]e refused to be intimidated by either officials or the news media. 'He talked back,' said George McArthur, who covered the Vietnam war for The Associated Press and the Los Angeles Times [and later was AP Cairo bureau chief].... 'Barry's door was always open and although he never shared a classified thought, he left you feeling that he had,' said former New York Times and CBS reporter Bernard Kalb. 'Even when he told you nothing, he was always persuasive.' 'In postwar years, Barry Zorthian remained steadfast to his conviction about the significant role the media must play in a democratic society,' said Peter Arnett, a Pulitzer Prize-winning war reporter for the AP in Vietnam and later a CNN foreign correspondent. ... Arnett recalled that when he [Arnett] complained about an American military policeman threatening to shoot him during a 1965 Buddhist street demonstration in Saigon, `Zorthian shook his head in mock concern, and said `D--- it, Peter, you threatened him and he was just responding.' 'What?' I replied. 'Yes,' Barry said, `you were aiming your pencil at him and that's more dangerous around here than a .45.'"

Zorthian was press media advisor to three successive U.S. ambassadors to South Vietnam — Henry Cabot Lodge Jr., Maxwell D. Taylor and Ellsworth Bunker — and to Gen. William C. Westmoreland, the U.S. military commander there. "Zorthian remained proud of his most controversial achievement ... [the] Follies.... [T]he briefings lasted a decade, the only regular forum in which U.S. and South Vietnamese officials spoke entirely on the record and were often challenged or contradicted by reporters, sometimes to their embarrassment ... [i]n the first U.S. war without formal censorship."

The press briefings convened in the conference room and rooftop garden of the Rex Hotel.

=== Career after Vietnam ===
Zorthian was an executive at Time Inc. and a lobbyist on communications issues after he left Saigon in 1968.

After the 1971 publication of the Pentagon Papers, Zorthian wrote an Op-Ed column in The Times asserting that the Vietnam War had been 'the most open war in history.' He said that almost all the important disclosures in the documents had already been known to journalists. In a letter to the editor in response, Elliot Bernstein, the ABC News Saigon bureau chief in the mid-1960s, countered that the press had been kept in the dark about the extent of American bombing of Laos beginning in 1964, as well as the fact that bases in Thailand were being used to conduct air raids on North Vietnam."

Zorthian retired from the Marine Corps Reserve as a Colonel in 1973.

From 1990 to 1994, he was a member of the oversight body for Radio Free Europe/Radio Liberty, the Board for International Broadcasting. Speaking in a National Press Club forum on March 19, 1991, Zorthian said, "The Gulf War is over and the press lost" about coverage of the later overseas US military engagement.

In the late 1990s, he became president of the Public Diplomacy Foundation (predecessor of the Public Diplomacy Council) and served four years in that role before occupying a seat on the council's board much of the last decade. He testified in August 2010, before the recently reformed Broadcasting Board of Governors on public diplomacy and VOA issues.

In 2009, Zorthian was a communications consultant with Alcalde and Fay. At that time he participated in a panel discussion on the history of the Smith-Mundt Act and the relationship between public diplomacy and the media.

== Personal ==
Zorthian's wife of 62 years, Margaret Aylaian Zorthian, died in July 2010.

In October 2010, Zorthian was given a 90th birthday 'roast and toast' which included Richard Holbrooke, who had begun his diplomatic career in Vietnam and would die soon after the gathering. Zorthian died December 30, 2010. He was buried at Arlington National Cemetery.

The Zorthians were survived by two sons, Greg and Steve, a daughter-in-law and two grandchildren.
