= United States news media and the Vietnam War =

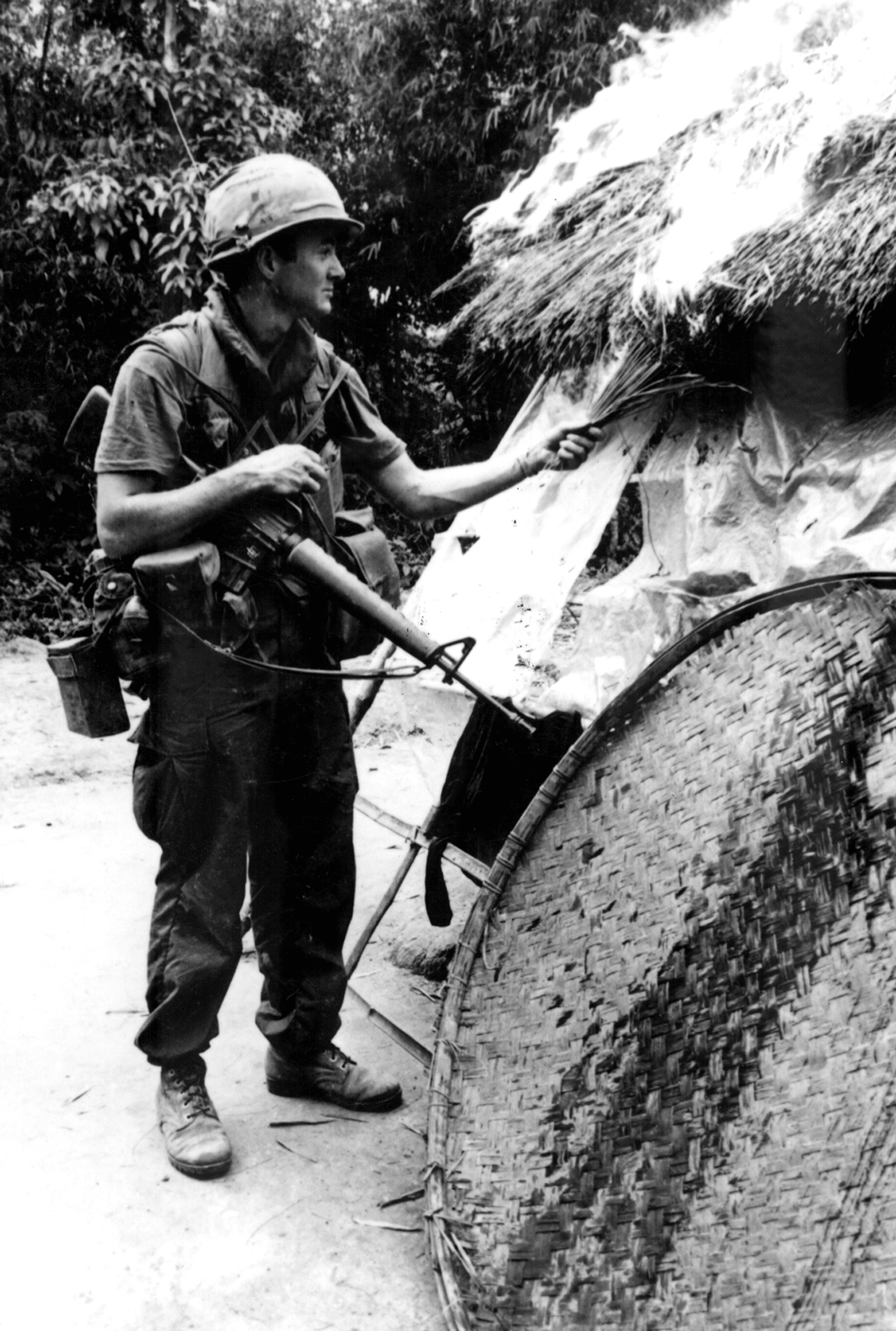
An American soldier setting fire to a dwelling during the events later known as the My Lai massacre, March 16, 1968 (photograph by Ronald L. Haeberle).

The role of the media in the perception of the Vietnam War has been widely noted. Intense levels of graphic news coverage correlated with dramatic shifts of public opinion regarding the conflict, and there is controversy over what effect journalism had on support or opposition to the war, as well as the decisions that policymakers made in response.

Heavily influenced by government information management in the early years of the conflict, the U.S. media eventually began to change its main source of information. Journalists focused more on research, interviews and analytical essays to obtain information rather than press conferences, official news releases and reports of official proceedings.

As more American households obtained television sets, it became easier for citizens to keep up with the war. The media played an immense role in what the American people saw and believed. Early American journalists in South Vietnam, like American policymakers and diplomats, lacked knowledge of the Vietnamese language and struggled to understand the country's culture and politics.

By the mid-1960s, it was becoming increasingly clear that the war was not going well for the U.S. and South Vietnam, despite the optimism of official accounts. As reports from the field became increasingly accessible to citizens, public opinion began to turn against U.S. involvement, though many Americans continued to support it. Others felt betrayed by their government for not being truthful about the war. This led to an increase in public pressure to end the war. By early February 1968, a Gallup poll showed only 32 percent of the population approved of President Lyndon B. Johnson’s handling of the war and 57 percent disapproved. The remaining 11 percent had no opinion.

Critical "failures to convey" occurred. During the 1968 Tet Offensive, the North Vietnamese government erred in its certainty that widespread assaults would trigger a supportive uprising of the population. People's Army of Vietnam (PAVN) and Viet Cong (VC) troops throughout the South attacked in force for the first time in the war; over the course of the offensive, 50,000 of these troops were killed (by Army of the Republic of Vietnam and American troops). The Viet Cong would not fight effectively as a cohesive force again until after two years of regeneration. These reversals on the battlefield failed to register on the American home front, as shocking photos and television imagery, along with critical appraisals by influential commentators such as CBS television anchor Walter Cronkite, undermined the U.S. position that the Tet Offensive was a failure.

== French Indochina War ==
The French lost control of Vietnam, which they had ruled as part of French Indochina, during World War II. In September 1945, they returned to reconquer Indochina; meanwhile, the Vietnamese were locked in a civil strife over the destiny of their postcolonial state. After the communist-led Viet Minh purge of rival political parties and the breakdown of negotiations, tensions between the Viet Minh and French authorities erupted into full-scale Indochina War in December 1946.

In 1949, the French and certain Vietnamese nationalists established the anti-communist State of Vietnam under Bảo Đại. In 1950, the United States began quietly supporting the French and the State of Vietnam, while media coverage emphasized the French Union rather than the American role. The French colonial government set up a system of censorship, but correspondents traveled to Singapore or Hong Kong to file their reports without constraint.

== Early US war, 1955–1965 ==
The news then reflected communism and the Cold War. In asking how the United States got into Vietnam, attention must be paid to the enormous strength of the Cold War consensus in the early 1960s shared by journalists and policymakers alike and due to the great power of the administration to control the agenda and the framing of foreign affairs reporting.

The first editorial about the rise of communism in Vietnam was published by The New York Times in January 1955. After the United States threw its weight behind Ngo Dinh Diem, who became South Vietnam's president in 1955, media in the United States ignored the new leader's despotic tendencies and instead highlighted his anti-communism. The death of civilians in an attempted coup against President Diem at the end of 1960 started to change how South Vietnam was viewed by the media. As a result, The New York Times sent the first reporter to Saigon, the capital of South Vietnam. That was followed by other journalists arriving from Reuters, Agence France Presse, Time and Newsweek. The basic policy governing how the US mission in Saigon handled the reporters reflected the way the administration of President John F. Kennedy conceived of the American role in the war. Under that framework, the Americans' role in South Vietnam was only to render advice and support in its war against the Communists.

=== Ap Bac ===
In January 1963, South Vietnamese forces engaged the Viet Cong at the Battle of Ap Bac. The reporting of what became a debacle for the South Vietnamese military, and the condemnation heaped upon it by the Western press became a controversial issue that then attracted a great deal of public attention. Both the US mission and Washington condemned the reports and questioned the motives of the correspondents involved. The Kennedy administration then went on the offensive, bombarding news editors in the US with complaints concerning the accuracy of the reporting of the Saigon press corps. The chain of events led to the interesting conundrum of American periodicals attacking the accuracy of their own on-the-spot reporters. The correspondents, however, did not question the black-and-white assumptions of the time that the war was a part of the larger struggle between the free world and totalitarianism or whether the war was beyond America's ability to win. They perceived their issues with the Saigon government as a conflict over tactics, not principles. Diem's government and military were hindering a positive solution to the problem. According to the reporters, the solution was for the US either to get rid of Diem or to take over direct control of the war itself.

Although the US mission was irate over the reporting of the battle, even the US Public Information Office (PIO) in Saigon had to admit, from partial information on an emotional subject, the reporting was "two-thirds accurate" and that the correspondents had done quite respectably. Ap Bac and the controversy surrounding it, however, marked a permanent divide in the relations between the official US position and the news media in South Vietnam. Before the battle, the media had criticized Diem and argued for more US control of the war, but they were still agreeable to the position of the diplomats and Military Assistance Command, Vietnam (MACV). After it, correspondents became steadily more convinced that they (and, by extension, the American people) were being lied to and withdrew, embittered, into their own community.

=== Buddhist crisis ===
The situation was only exacerbated during the Buddhist crisis of May 1963, when the Diem government considered the foreign press as its enemy and was unwilling to communicate its side of the story effectively. (Note: Diem's beliefs and accusations against the press, however, had little basis in fact. Of 33 stories with Vietnam datelines appearing in The New York Times in the four months preceding the crisis, only three could have been said to have dealt primarily with South Vietnamese politics. None dealt with the noncommunist opposition to the Diem regime. The four months were typical.) While the top levels of the US mission in Saigon were inordinately closemouthed around reporters during this period, others, especially those who disagreed with the policy of supporting Diem, were not. They leaked information from discussions with Diem to the press, embarrassing him and thwarting the embassy's vigorous efforts to win an end to the anti-Buddhist repressions. Once again, however, despite occasional factual errors and conflict between the press and the embassy, most of the news commentaries were reasonably accurate. The US Army's official history of military-media relations reported, "Although marred at times by rhetoric and mistaken facts, they often probed to the heart of the crisis." During the Buddhist Crisis, the number of correspondents in South Vietnam swelled from an original nucleus of eight to a contingent of over 60.

By 1964, the leadership of both the US and South Vietnam had changed hands. US President Kennedy had been assassinated, and Diem had been murdered during a US-backed military coup. Instead of paving the way for political stability, however, Diem's demise only unleashed a maelstrom of political unrest. Coup followed coup as South Vietnamese generals vied for power. There were seven governments in Saigon during 1964: three between 16 August and 3 September alone. The war in South Vietnam ground on, and the Viet Cong was making serious headway. Following the recommendations of an internal report, MACV made the decision that since news correspondents were "thoroughly knowledgeable" about the war, its Public Affairs Office (JUSPAO) would attempt to woo reporters by providing them with "up to date, factual information on current operations and policies".

=== Problems ===
Although Operation Candor was a welcome relief for correspondents, it did not halt the media's dubiousness concerning the efficacy of the Saigon government or further American involvement with it. Reporters had also become quite aware that all sides (the South Vietnamese and American governments, the US mission, MACV, the Buddhists, and the Viet Cong) were trying to manipulate them. It did not help matters that JUSPAO was also MACV's propaganda arm, a fact that was well known to news correspondents. The American public was also dissatisfied with the course of events in South Vietnam. A January 1965 Gallup poll indicated that two out of three Americans agreed that the country would never form a stable government and that four out of five Americans felt that the communists were winning. Few, however, wanted a unilateral US withdrawal and 50 percent believed that the US was obliged to defend independent nations from communist aggression.

From the early stages of the war and until its end, the South Vietnamese people were regularly viewed by the media with condescension, contempt, and disdain. The media exhibited the "Cold War myopia, ethnocentrism, cultural bias, and racism embedded in American ideology". American journalists arrived in Vietnam with almost no knowledge of its culture, history, society, or language, and they did not attempt to learn. One reason was that most journalists spent on rotation only six to twelve months in South Vietnam, providing little incentive for reporters to learn the language. Although the US Department of Defense offered a brief introductory course for journalists on the history and the culture of Vietnam, few attended it. Meanwhile, none of the networks trained their correspondents to understand military matters. Although the "pacification" of South Vietnam's villages was the continuously touted supreme goal of the Saigon government, the U.S. Mission, MACV, and the media, there was little real discussion within the media as to why it was so difficult to convince the Vietnamese peasantry to join the side of the Saigon government.

As for the PAVN and VC, American readers rarely encountered the argument that they were waging a war of reunification, rather than "a campaign to further the interests of a communist conspiracy masterminded by the People's Republic of China and the Soviet Union". The domino theory was utilized to justify the American intervention in order to prevent regional domination by China, ignoring the fact of centuries of hostility between the Vietnamese and the Chinese. Throughout the war PAVN/VC troops were continuously portrayed as "brutal, cruel, fanatic, sinister, untrustworthy, and warlike. Most depictions of [them] employed hateful imagery or reinforced racial stereotypes of the era associated with Asians." Asian stereotypes extended to the American soldiers' view of their South Vietnamese allies too; most effectively never met a South Vietnamese soldier or really knew the farmer and peasant in the field. Southern guerilla forces were referred to as Viet Cong (despite its wide usage, "Viet Cong", which means "Vietnamese Communist," is considered pejorative).

== Escalation, 1965–1967 ==
In a key televised debate from 15 May 1965, Eric Sevareid, reporting for CBS, conducted a debate between two of Johnson’s advisers, McGeorge Bundy and Hans Morgenthau, dealing with an acute summary of the main war concerns of the U.S. as seen at that time: "(1) What are the justifications for the American presence in Vietnam – why are we there? (2) What is the fundamental nature of this war? Is it aggression from North Vietnam or is it basically, a civil war between the peoples of South Vietnam? (3) What are the implications of this Vietnam struggle in terms of Communist China's power and aims and future actions? And (4) What are the alternatives to our present policy in Vietnam?"

From 40 in 1964, the press corps in South Vietnam had grown to 282 by January 1966. By August that number had jumped to 419. Of the 282 at the beginning of the year, only 110 were Americans; 67 were South Vietnamese, 26 Japanese, 24 British, 13 Korean, 11 French, and seven were German. Of the Americans present, 72 were more than 31 years old, including 60 over the age of 36; similar age demographics were present among the 143 non-Americans. (Note: These numbers, however, were deceiving. Fully half of those accredited were not reporters but instead technicians, secretaries, drivers, translators or wives.) Correspondents with valid accreditations had to show their credentials to receive a card that gave them access to military transportation and facilities. All other correspondents had to present a letter from their editors stating that they represented a bona fide newsgathering organization, which would take responsibility for their conduct. Freelance correspondents were required to produce a letter from one of their clients affirming that agency's willingness to purchase their work.

An early divide between the personalities of the US government and the Saigon press corps can be seen in the aftermath of Operation Starlite, a large-scale search-and-destroy mission conducted during the escalation phase of 1965. Although highly successful, the operation saw a resupply convoy, Column 21, disabled and pinned down under heavy enemy fire. Although the ambushers were forced back and the survivors rescued, the United States Marine Corps would deny the column's existence just the very next day, preferring to focus on the operation's success instead, much to the ire of the reporting journalists, who had risked their lives to help load the column's many casualties onto their impromptu evacuation helicopter.

The U.S. Mission and MACV also installed an "information czar", the U.S. Mission's Minister-Counselor for Public Affairs, Barry Zorthian, to advise MACV commander, General William Westmoreland on public affairs matters and who had a theoretical responsibility under the ambassador for the development of all information policy. He maintained liaison between the US embassy, MACV, and the press; publicized information to refute erroneous and misleading news stories; and sought to assist the Saigon correspondents in covering the side of the war most favorable to the policies of the U.S. government. Zorthian possessed both experience with the media and a great deal of patience and tact, and maintained reasonably good relations with the press corps. Media correspondents were invited to attend nightly MACV briefings covering the day's events that became known as the Five O'Clock Follies, most correspondents considering the briefings to be a waste of time. The Saigon bureau chiefs were also often invited to closed sessions at which presentations would be made by a briefing officer, the CIA station chief, or an official from the embassy who would present background or off-the-record information on upcoming military operations or Vietnamese political events.

According to Daniel Hallin, the dramatic structure of the uncensored "living room war" as reported during 1965–67 remained simple and traditional: "the forces of good were locked in battle once again with the forces of evil. What began to change in 1967… was the conviction that the forces of good would inevitably prevail." During late 1967, MACV had also begun to disregard the decision that it had made at the Honolulu Conference of 1966 that the military should leave the justification of the war to elected officials in Washington. The military found itself drawn progressively into politics to the point that it had become as involved in "selling" the war to the American public as the political appointees it served. That change would have far-reaching detrimental effects.

== Tet Offensive: 1968 ==
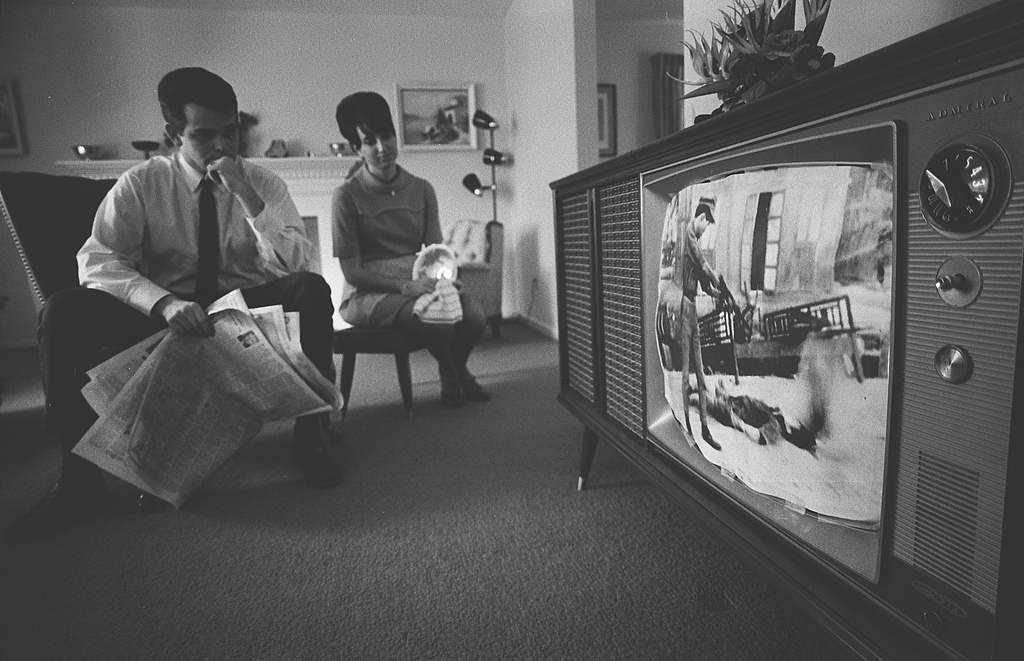
An American man and woman watching footage of the Vietnam War on television in their living room, February 1968

By 1968, American forces had been engaged in large-scale ground combat in Vietnam, with substantial American casualties, for more than three years. Public support for the war was weakening. In January 1968, Viet Cong troops launched a surprise attack in South Vietnam, known as the Tet Offensive; one of the points of attack was the U.S. Embassy in Saigon. Though US troops were able to fend off the Viet Cong and ultimately prevailed militarily, the attack signaled a turning point in both the US troops' morale and in the public trust of the government's reports on the progress of the war, as many Americans had no idea that the VC were capable of infiltrating American and South Vietnamese headquarters in the way that they did. Many Americans were unaware of the extent of the brutality involved in the war, but the Tet Offensive changed that, and American television cameras were available firsthand to record footage of the bombing of cities and the execution of prisoners of war.

Although access to North Vietnam by western correspondents was difficult, it was possible, especially when the authorities, who heavily oversaw and restricted any such visit, saw an advantage in the situation. During a bombing halt in December 1966, Harrison E. Salisbury of The New York Times became the first correspondent from a major US newspaper to go to North Vietnam. His reporting of the bombing damage to civilian targets forced the Pentagon to admit that accidents and "collateral damage" had occurred during the bombing campaign. For his effort, Salisbury received heavy condemnation and criticism from his peers, the administration, and the Pentagon. Other correspondents who later made the journey to North Vietnam included Mary McCarthy, Anthony Lewis, Michael McLear from the Canadian Broadcasting Corporation and R. K. Karanjia from India. Agence France Presse maintained a bureau there throughout the war.

The highly-dangerous task of reporting with the PAVN/VC in the South was left to Wilfred Burchett, an Australian who had begun reporting on the war in 1963. He freelanced for the Japanese Mainichi Shimbun group, the British communist daily The Morning Star, and the American National Guardian. Burchett made no pretense of his communist sympathies, but his reporting of communist schools, arsenals, hospitals, administrative structure, and logistics made what Phillip Knightley called "intriguing reading."

Because he reported from the communist side, Burchett was regarded by many in Australia as a traitor and was persona non grata with the Australian government, but he also possessed extraordinary information. He was later joined by a correspondent for French communist newspaper L'Humanité. and veteran of the French Resistance, Madeleine Riffaud. Their work featured in a documentary by filmmaker Roger Pic, Dans le maquis du Sud-Vietnam (“With the maquis in South Vietnam”) (1965).

Perhaps the most famous image of the Tet Offensive (taken by Eddie Adams) was of a Viet Cong member being executed by the Southern Vietnamese Police General, General Nguyen Ngoc Loan. Adams won a prize for his iconic photograph, which was said to be more influential than the footage by the Australian film cameraman Neil Davis that was released of the same execution.

After visiting South Vietnam during the Tet Offensive, Walter Cronkite of CBS News said in an editorial broadcast on 27 February 1968, "To say that we are closer to victory today is to believe, in the face of the evidence, the optimists who have been wrong in the past. To suggest we are on the edge of defeat is to yield to unreasonable pessimism. To say that we are mired in stalemate seems the only realistic, yet unsatisfactory, conclusion." Following Cronkite's editorial report, President Lyndon Johnson is reported to have said, "If I've lost Cronkite, I've lost Middle America." Whether that statement was actually made by Johnson has been called into doubt.

Support for the war plummeted, and though 200,000 troops were requested at the beginning of the Offensive, the request was denied.

The media's role in bringing a strikingly different depiction of the war into American homes from that of the government signaled a shift in where the American public lay its trust, increasingly toward media reports about the war and away from federal reports about it. Many researchers now agree that "across the political spectrum, the relation between the media and the government during Vietnam was in fact one of conflict: the media contradicted the more positive view of the war officials sought to project, and for better or for worse it was the journalists' view that prevailed with the public, whose disenchantment forced an end to American involvement."

== Withdrawal, 1969–1973 ==
Many Americans felt betrayed by the government for withholding or deliberately manipulating information about the progress of the war, and once they saw on their televisions and read in their newspapers firsthand a less optimistic version of the war than the government had painted, public pressure to withdraw from Vietnam mounted.

A study authorized by the Trilateral Commission in 1975 to examine the "governability" of American democracy found that "the most notable new source of national power in 1970, as compared to 1950, was the national media", suggesting also that there was "considerable evidence to suggest that the development of television journalism contributed to the undermining of governmental authority". Although this report was commissioned on the heels of the messy conflict of the war itself, the sentiment that the development of new journalistic media such as television supplanted governmental authority in attaining the support of the American public during the Vietnam War has been accepted and upheld by many scholars through to the present day.

On 3 November 1969, President Richard M. Nixon made a televised speech laying out his policy toward Vietnam. He promised to continue to support the South Vietnamese government (through Vietnamization) and held out a plan for the withdrawal of American combat troops. This "silent majority" speech, not the Tet Offensive, marked the real watershed of the American involvement. In it, Nixon permanently altered the nature of the issue. "No longer was the question whether the United States was going to get out, but rather how and how fast." Nixon's policy toward the media was to reduce as far as possible the American public's interest in and knowledge of the war in Vietnam. He began by sharply limiting the press's access to information within Vietnam itself.

=== Changes ===
The peace talks in Paris, the viability of South Vietnam, of its military and its government, and its effect on American disengagement, became the prime stories during this period for the news media. The reportage of the Tet/Battle of Khe Sanh period had been unique, and after it was over reportage settled back into its normal routines. According to Clarence Wyatt, the American disengagement was:

like watching a film running backward. American troops were leaving until there were only a handful of advisers left. The communists were once again on the advance, spreading their influence closer and closer to the major cities. The South Vietnamese military was once again on the defensive, and the leadership of the nation was isolated and increasingly paranoid… Nixon's goal, like Kennedy's, was for the press to have nothing to report.

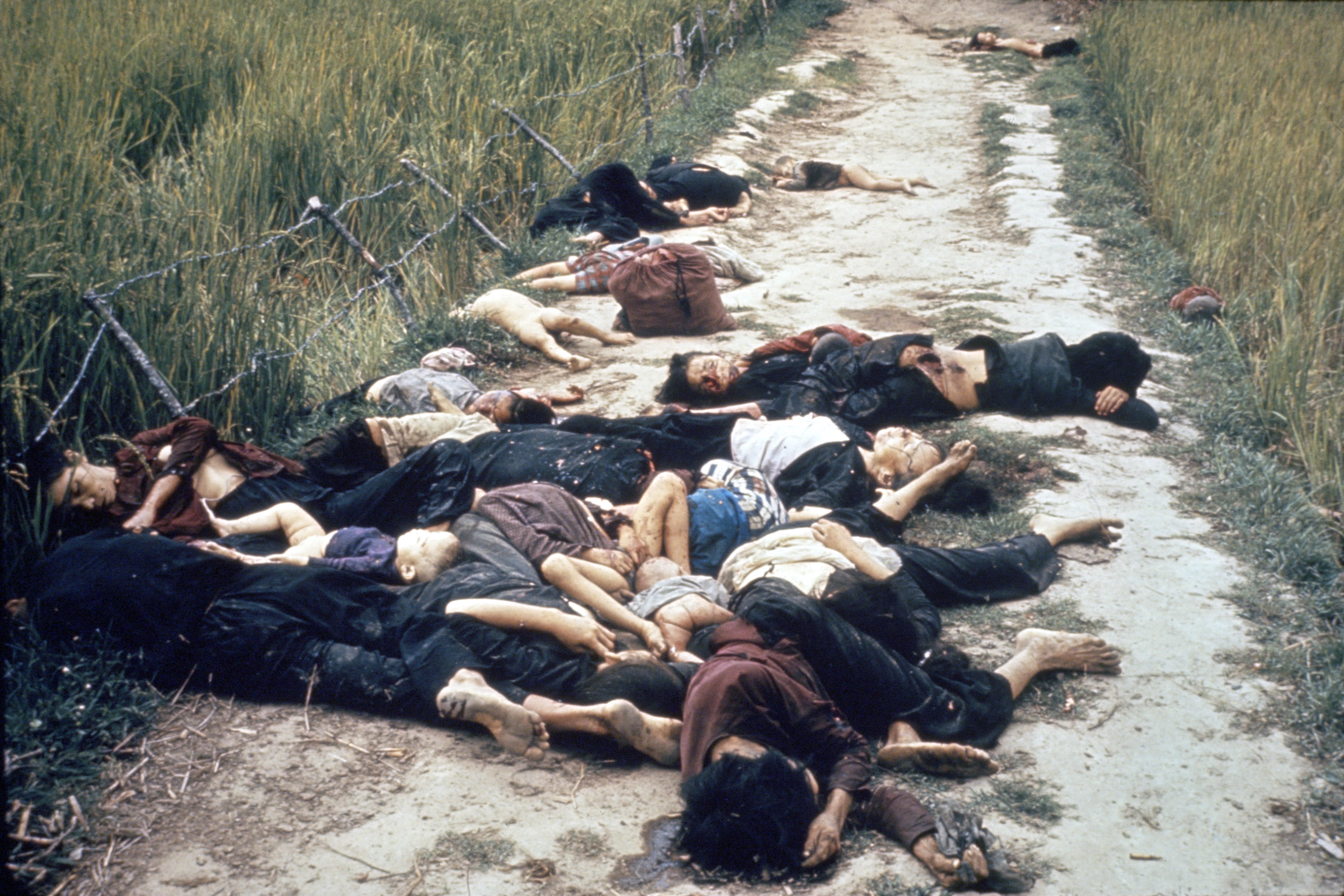
One of Ronald Haeberle's photos taken at My Lai which helped expose the massacre four years after it occurred

The gradual dissipation of American support for the war was apparent in changes in the source of news stories. The traditional sources – press conferences, official news releases, and reports of official proceedings were less utilized than ever before. Reporters were doing more research, conducting more interviews, and publishing more analytical essays. There was also an increase in the number of American homes with televisions (which led to a rise in people gaining their knowledge of the war from television). The media never became "acutely critical… but soberer, and more skeptical" It did not, however, examine or reexamine its basic assumptions about the nature of the war it had helped to propagate. Never, for example, did historian Daniel Hallin hear an American correspondent or commentator utter the word imperialism in connection with the U.S. commitment on television. On those rare occasions when the underlying reasons for the American intervention were explicitly questioned, journalists continued to defend the honorableness of American motives.

Television's image of the war, however, had been permanently altered: the "guts and glory" image of the pre-Tet period was gone forever. For the most part, television remained a follower rather than a leader. According to Daniel Hallin, "It was not until the collapse of consensus was well under way that coverage began to turn around; and when it did turn, it only turned so far. The later years of Vietnam were a remarkable testimony to the restraining power of the routines and ideology of objective journalism… 'advocacy journalism' made no real inroads into network television."

As the American commitment waned there was an increasing media emphasis on Vietnamization, the South Vietnamese government, and casualties – both American and Vietnamese. There was also increasing coverage of the collapse of morale, interracial tensions, drug abuse, and disciplinary problems among American troops. These stories increased in number as U.S. soldiers "began to worry about being the last casualty in the lame-duck war". The U.S. military resented the attention and at first, refused to believe that the problems were as bad as correspondents portrayed them. The media demonstrated, however, "that the best reporters, by virtue of their many contacts, had a better grasp of the war's unmanageable human element than the policy makers supposedly in control".

The next "big story" to come out of Vietnam occurred in May 1969 with the Battle of Hamburger Hill (Dong Ap Bia or Hill 937). The high number of American casualties (70 dead and 372 wounded) produced an unusual burst of explicit questioning of military tactics from correspondents in the field and from Congressmen in Washington. After the battle's conclusion, major battles of attrition involving American ground forces became rare – as did commentaries from correspondents similar to those about Hamburger Hill.

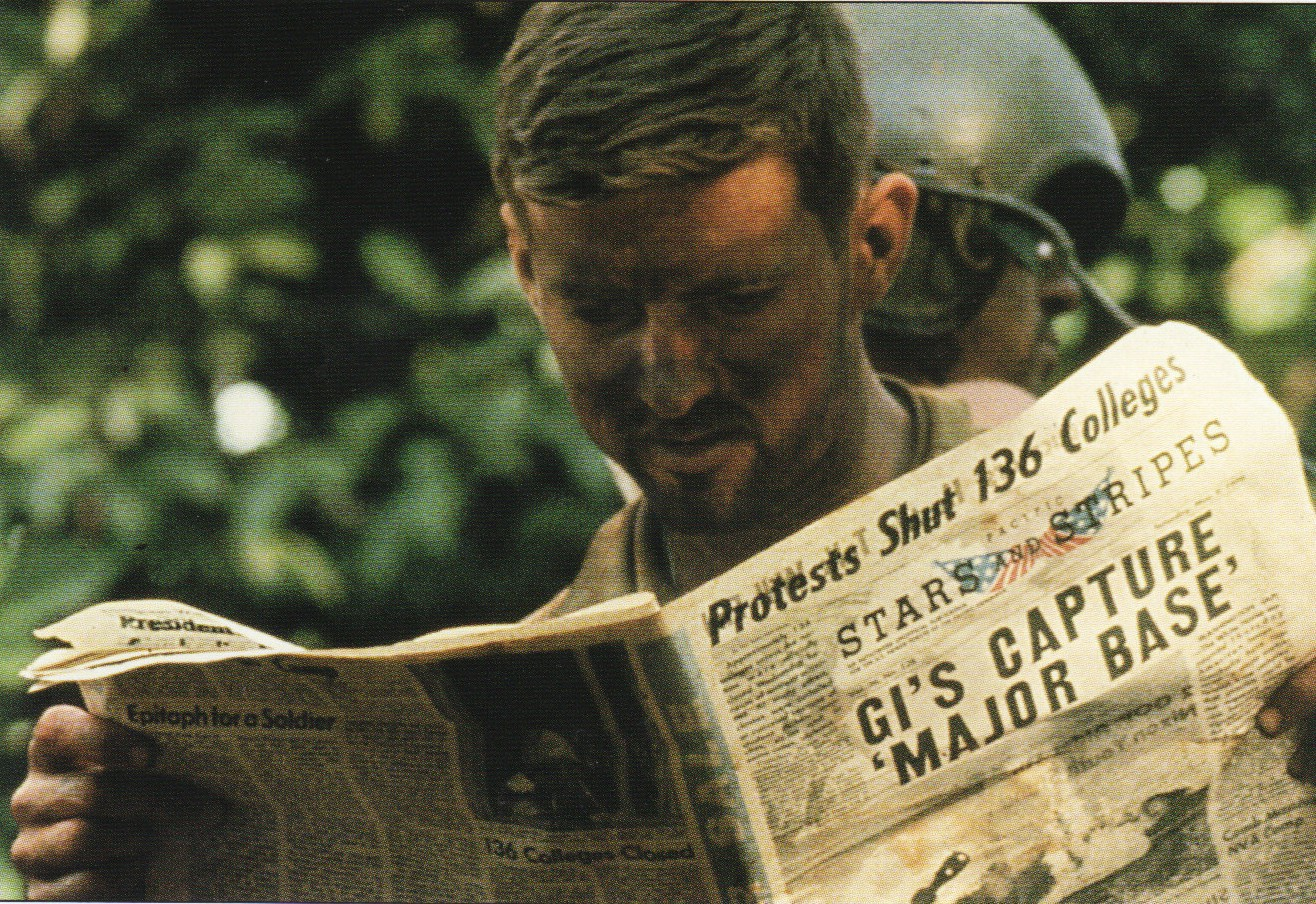
News from two fronts: American soldier reading Stars and Stripes, the official U.S. armed forces newspaper, while in Cambodia

Tensions between the news media and the Nixon administration only increased as the war dragged on. In September and October 1969, members of the administration openly discussed methods by which the media could be coerced into docility. Possible methods included Internal Revenue Service audits, Justice Department antitrust lawsuits against major television networks and newspapers that could be accused of monopolistic business practices, and the monitoring incidents of "unfairness" by television broadcasters that would be turned over to the Federal Communications Commission for possible legal action.

=== Last years ===
As the war lengthened and the withdrawals continued, the two sides became more and more antagonistic toward one another and they battled constantly over the issues of combat refusals and the drug and morale problems of American troops. Fatigue with the war and each other have been cited for this escalating antagonism. Although MACV officially remained dedicated to providing evenly balanced public affairs information, the situation was exacerbated by the manpower drawdowns at the Public Affairs Office itself.

The Easter Offensive of 1972 (a conventional North Vietnamese invasion of South Vietnam) was generally depicted by MACV and Washington as a "true test" of the policy of Vietnamization. It was also readily apparent to the media that American airpower had saved the day. The press reported heavily on the "mixed" capabilities of the South Vietnamese defense and on the retaliatory U.S. bombing effort in North Vietnam, Operation Linebacker. Secretary of Defense Melvin Laird declined to criticize the negative reporting, which he described as "generally balanced".

By the end of 1971, the number of accredited American correspondents had declined to fewer than 200. By September 1973 that number had dwindled to only 59. As the war became more and more a South Vietnamese affair, the Saigon government tried to silence unofficial news sources, tightening its information guidelines and stringently punishing any who violated them. Even as the Easter Offensive waned, President Nguyễn Văn Thiệu passed a martial law decree that made circulating news or images "detrimental to the national security" a criminal offense.

With the breakdown of peace negotiations with Hanoi, President Nixon launched Operation Linebacker II, an extensive aerial bombardment campaign that began on 16 December 1972. Nixon, in an effort to conceal the breakdown of talks, ordered that the public explanation for the bombing be linked to "a possible enemy offensive in the South". With no information flowing from the White House, the Pentagon, or MACV, North Vietnam's propaganda was all that correspondents had to go on and it was extensively reported by the media. The American people, however, were unconvinced. According to a Harris poll, fewer than 50 percent agreed that it was "inhuman and immoral for the U.S. to have bombed Hanoi's civilian center" and 71 percent believed "what we did in bombing Hanoi was no worse than what the communists have done in the Vietnam War". Following the campaign, Hanoi returned to the negotiating table and (after some wrangling with the Saigon government) the Paris Peace Accords were signed on 27 January 1973. For the United States, the Vietnam War was almost over.

== See also ==
- Media bias in the United States
- Media coverage of the Gulf War
- Media coverage of the Iraq War

== Bibliography ==
- Hallin, Daniel C. (1986), The Uncensored War: The Media and Vietnam, New York: Oxford University Press.
- Hammond, William M. (1990) [1988], Public Affairs: The Military and the Media, 1962–1968, United States Army in Vietnam, Washington, DC: United States Army Center of Military History, archived from the original on November 8, 2010.
- ——— (1996), Public Affairs: The Military and the Media, 1968–1973, United States Army in Vietnam, Washington, DC: United States Army Center of Military History, ISBN 0-16-048696-3, archived from the original on October 18, 2017.
- ——— (1998), Reporting Vietnam: Media & Military at War, USA: University Press of Kansas.
- Landers, James (2004), The Weekly War: News magazines and Vietnam, USA: University of Missouri Press.
- Zi Jun Toong (2008). "Overthrown by the Press: The US Media's Role in the Fall of Diem". Australasian Journal of American Studies. 27 (1): 56–72. JSTOR 41054100.
- Nguyen Quoc, Tan Trung (November 20, 2023). "Rethinking History and News Media in South Vietnam". US–Vietnam Research Center. University of Oregon.

=== Published government documents ===
- William H., Darley (May 1, 2005), "War Policy, Public Support, and the Media", The US Army War College Quarterly: Parameters, vol. 35, no. 2, Parameters.

=== Document collections ===
- Reporting Vietnam: American Journalism, 1959–1975. Two volumes. New York: Library of America, 1998.

=== Memoirs and biographies ===
- Stienmann, Ron (2002), Inside Television's First War: A Saigon Journal, Columbia, MO: University of Missouri Press.
- Westmoreland, William C. (1976), A Soldier Reports, New York: Doubleday.

=== Secondary sources ===
- Bowden, Tim (1987). One Crowded Hour: Neil Davis Combat Cameraman. Sydney: Collins.
- Braestrup, Peter, Big Story: How the American Press and Television Reported and Interpreted the Crisis of Tet 1968 in Vietnam and Washington. Boulder, CO: Westview Press, 1977. ISBN 0-89158-012-3.
- Campbell, W. Joseph (2010). "Debunking the 'Cronkite Moment'". Getting It Wrong: Ten of the Greatest Misreported Stories in American Journalism. University of California Press. pp. 85–100. ISBN 978-0-52026-209-6. JSTOR 10.1525/j.ctt1ppncz.10.
- Felman, Marc, The Military/Media Clash and the New Principle of War : Media Spin.
- Hallin, Daniel C (1984). "The Media, the War in Vietnam, and Political Support: a Critique of the Thesis of an Oppositional Media". The Journal of Politics. 46 (1): 2–24. doi:10.2307/2130432. JSTOR 2130432. S2CID 154293972.
- ——— (March 2003), "Presentation" (PDF), American Media and Wartime Challenges (Conference), archived from the original (PDF) on August 10, 2007.
- ——— (2006), "The 'Living-Room War': Media and Public Opinion in A Limited War", in Weist, Andrew (ed.), Rolling Thunder in A Gentle Land: The Vietnam War Revisited, London: Osprey Press.
- ———, "Vietnam on Television", TV Museum, archived from the original on June 28, 2011.
- Kaiser, Charles, 1968 In America. New York: Grove Press, 1997
- Karnow, Stanley, Vietnam: A History. New York Viking, 1983.
- Kinnard, Douglas (1977). The War Managers. Hanover, NH: University Press of New England.
- Knightley, Phillip (2002). The First Casualty: The War Correspondent as Hero and Myth-Maker from the Crimea to Kosovo. Baltimore, MD: The Johns Hopkins University Press.
- Landers, James, The Weekly War: Newsmagazines and Vietnam. Columbia MO: University of Missouri Press, 2004.
- Lichty, Lawrence W, "Comments on the Influence of Television on Public Opinion" in Peter Braestrup, ed. Vietnam as History. Washington, D.C.: Wilson Center, 1984.
- Linder, Doug. "The My Lai Massacre and Courts-Martial: An Account". Famous Trials. UMKC School of Law.
- Maitland, Terrence and Stephen Weiss, Raising the Stakes. Boston: Boston Publishing Co., 1982.
- Mueller, John E, War, Presidents, and Public Opinion. New York: John Wiley & Sons, 1973.
- Oberdorfer, Don (2001). Tet!: The Turning Point in the Vietnam War. JHU Press. ISBN 978-0-801-86703-3.
- Page, Caroline (1996). US Propaganda During the Vietnam War, 1965-73: The Limits of Persuasion. Continuum International Publishing Group Ltd. ISBN 978-0718519995.
- Ramonet, Ignacio (April 2000), "Show us the truth about Vietnam", Le Monde Diplomatique.
- Schmitz, David F, The Tet Offensive: Politics, War, and Public Opinion. New York: Rowman & Littlefield, 2005.
- Willbanks, James H, The Tet Offensive: A Concise History. New York: Columbia University Press, 2006.
- Wyatt, Clarence (1993). Paper Soldiers: The American Press and the Vietnam War. New York: Norton.
- Zaffiri, Samuel (1988). Hamburger Hill. Novato, CA: Presidio Press.
- Zimmer, Louis B. (2011). The Vietnam War Debate. Lexington Books. ISBN 978-0-73913769-7.
