= Joshua Goldberg =

Joshua Goldberg may refer to:

- Joshua L. Goldberg (1896–1994), Belarusian-born American rabbi
- Joshua N. Goldberg (1925–2020), American physicist
- Joshua Ryne Goldberg (born 1995), American internet troll convicted of attempting a bombing
