= ICCP =

ICCP may refer to:

- IBS Center for Climate Physics, a basic science research center headed by German physicist Axel Timmermann
- IC Catholic Prep (Elmhurst, Illinois), a Roman Catholic High School in Elmhurst, Illinois
- Impressed Current Cathodic Protection, a system used to control the corrosion using anodes connected to a DC power source
- Institute for Certification of Computing Professionals, a non-profit organization that develops and administers certifications for the information technology industry
- Inter-Control Center Communications Protocol, an operational protocol used by electrical utilities as part of IEC 60870-6
- International Climate Change Partnership, an industry group dealing with climate change issues
- International Committee for Coal Petrology; see Marie-Therese Mackowsky
- International Coordinating Committee on the Question of Palestine
- Islamic Community Center of Phoenix, a mosque in Phoenix, Arizona
- iCCP, an ancillary chunk in the PNG image file format
