= Hassan Abujihaad =

Former US Navy sailor convicted of supporting terrorism

- Born: Paul Raphael Hall; 1976 (age 49–50)
- Occupation: United States Navy sailor (1998 to 2002, honorably discharged)
- Spouse: Takia Haji (m. 2000; div. 2005)
- Children: 2

Hassan Abujihaad (born Paul R. Hall; 1976) is a former sailor in the United States Navy convicted of supporting terrorism.

A native of Phoenix, Arizona and a convert to Islam, Abujihaad was convicted of disclosing the location of Navy ships and their weaknesses to an online forum in April 2001 while serving as a naval signalman on board the USS Benfold.

== Early life ==
Abujihaad grew up in Southern California. He legally changed his name from Paul Raphael Hall to Hassan Abujihaad in 1997, and enlisted in the Navy in January 1998. He was honorably discharged in 2002.

Abujihaad married Takia Haji in 2000. He filed for divorce in 2005 and was awarded sole custody of their two children during the following year. He occasionally attended the Islamic Community Center of Phoenix, which is also the mosque that Elton Simpson, one of the gunmen shot dead in the attempted Curtis Culwell Center attack of May 2015, attended.

== Arrest, trial, and conviction ==
Police arrested Abujihaad in March 2007 in Phoenix, Arizona. He entered a plea of not guilty on April 4, 2007. On March 5, 2008, he was convicted by a jury in New Haven, Connecticut. Federal prosecutors said the then-32-year-old had admitted disclosing military intelligence. He was sentenced to ten years in prison, the maximum penalty for the crime.

In 2009, the Sunday Mercury reported that Abujihaad's first link to terrorism came at the Maktabah Al Ansar bookstore in Sparkhill, Birmingham, England.
