= Louis Abramson =

American architect (1887–1985)

- Born: August 1, 1887; New York City, U.S.
- Died: January 15, 1985 (aged 97); Manhattan, New York, U.S.
- Other name: Louis Abrahamson
- Occupation: Architect
- Buildings: Daughters of Jacob Geriatric Center

Louis Allen Abramson (August 1, 1887 – January 15, 1985) was an American architect who practiced mostly in New York City, specializing in hospitals, nursing homes, and restaurants. He is best known for designing the Daughters of Jacob Geriatric Center in the Bronx. Early in his career, he designed several Jewish Centers, a new type of building which filled the religious, cultural, educational, and often fitness needs of the community in a single structure. Later commissions included several restaurants for the Horn & Hardart, Longchamps, and Brass Rail chains, a nightclub, and a large office building.

Abramson had little formal schooling in architecture; he took courses at Cooper Union, the Mechanics Institute, and Columbia University but did not complete a degree. Most of his training was on-the-job in junior positions at well-known New York City architecture firms, after which he started his own firm. He employed a variety of styles, including Neo-Renaissance, Moorish Revival, Neo-Classical, Tudor, Art Deco, and Art Moderne. Several of his buildings are listed on the National Register of Historic Places.

== Education and early career ==
Louis Allen Abramson (also known as Louis Abrahamson) was born in New York City on August 1, 1887. He and his wife Pearl had two daughters, Anita Claire and Judith, but little else is known about his personal life. Abramson did not have a traditional architecture education; he attended Cooper Union (where civil engineering failed to hold his interest) and then the Mechanics Institute but did not graduate from either. His introduction to architecture came when he took a job as an office boy and later a draftsman for John H. Duncan, a New York City architect. After leaving Duncan's employ, Abramson moved to Seattle but only stayed there for a few years. Upon his return to New York, he took extension courses at Columbia University and was hired to work in Louis Gerard's office as a draftsman where he learned to appreciate the Beaux-Arts style. Between c. 1908 and c. 1910 he worked in the practice of John Galen Howard and also that of Louis E. Jallade. Jallade specialized in buildings for the Young Men's Christian Association, which influenced Abramson's 1913 design of a building for the Young Woman's Hebrew Association.

Abramson started his own firm in 1912 and was issued an architectural license in 1914. In 1915, he had an office at 220 Fifth Avenue and later moved to 25 West 45th Street, both in Manhattan. Early in his career, Abramson developed an appreciation of the work of McKim, Mead & White, being especially fond of the University Club and Penn Station. When interviewed in 1980, Abramson said that each time he went by the University Club, he would spend some time looking at it and "figuratively bow". He also expressed sadness over Penn Station's destruction, saying that he admired Grand Central Terminal, but considered Penn Station to be perfect and "felt meek in [its] presence." He was particularly impressed with the spacing of the bronze letters on the Seventh Avenue side of the building, which inspired him to study architectural lettering. In the same interview, Abramson also said that although he admired the work of Cass Gilbert, especially "his modernity ... his breakaway from the classical school," and Stanford White influenced his early work, his later designs were done to his own tastes and inclinations.

In 1935, Abramson was appointed by Mayor Fiorello La Guardia to be one of 50 architects eligible to bid on municipal projects which would cost more than $100,000 (equivalent to $1.8 million in 2025). The selection criteria included using firms from all the boroughs as well as providing opportunities for some of the newer firms in the city. The selection jury had initially contacted approximately 2,000 firms, of which about 500 expressed interest in being chosen.

== Home of the Daughters of Jacob ==
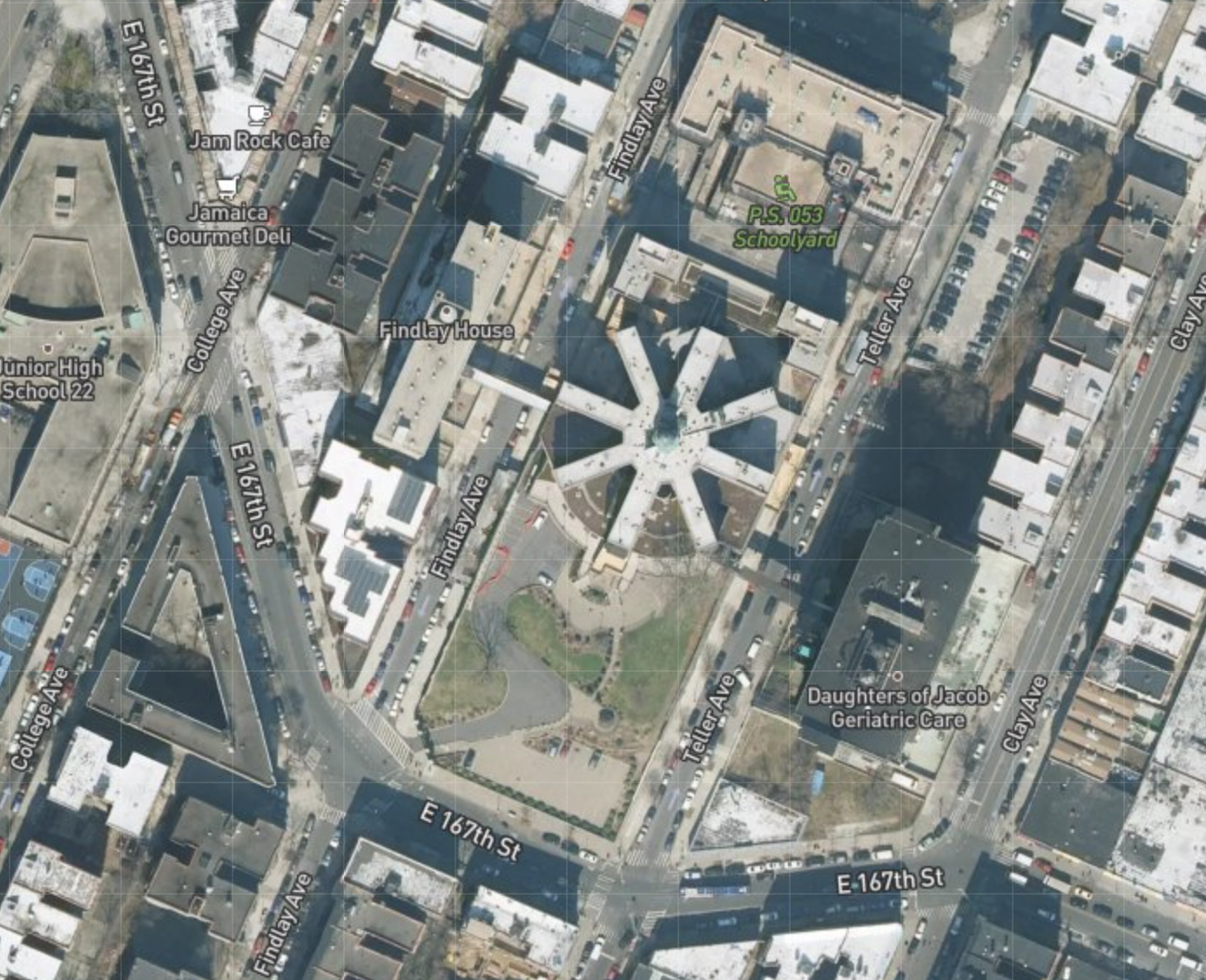
Aerial photograph of the Daughters of Jacob Home, showing the 8-spoked plan

In 1916, Abramson designed the Home of the Daughters of Jacob, an institution serving elderly Orthodox Jews, on 167th Street between Findlay and Teller Avenues in the Bronx. The building is wheel-shaped, with eight wings arranged radially around a central core. The land consists of 36 lots which were previously part of American founding father Gouverneur Morris's estate; at the time of purchase by the Daughters of Jacob, it was still occupied by Morris's 1812 house, which was demolished to make room for the new building.

The central core contained administrative offices and was topped by a tower, which at the time of its construction was the highest point in the Bronx. The eight wings were residences for more than 1,000 elderly men and women. This new building replaced the existing home run by the Daughters of Jacob at 301 East Broadway, about 9 miles (14 km) to the south, on Manhattan's Lower East Side, which could house only 200 people. The plans for the new building included a synagogue with seating for 1,000 people, a 600-seat dining room, as well as a hospital, library, and a Turkish bath, with construction costs for the four-story building estimated to be $300,000 (equivalent to $6.1 million in 2025). A fifth story added to the building in 1938 provided further hospital space for operating rooms along with X-ray, cardiological, physiotherapy, and dental facilities at a cost of $180,000 (equivalent to $3.2 million in 2025).

By 1973, the building was deemed no longer fit for its original purpose, owing to new health codes. Abramson, then 84 years old, was part of the design team that modernized the building, connecting it by pedestrian bridges to new buildings on the opposite sides of Findlay and Teller Avenues. Abramson told The New York Times that the philosophy of how to house the elderly had changed over the years; previously it was felt that providing meals and a bed in a ward was acceptable, but modern practice was to offer greater privacy, individual dignity, and opportunities to remain active.

== Jewish centers ==
Abramson designed several Jewish Centers, including the first one in Manhattan. Sometimes called a "shul with a pool", this style of building evolved to serve both the religious and secular needs of American congregations. In addition to a sanctuary, there would be classrooms and social halls. Larger examples might include a gymnasium and a swimming pool. Jewish historian David Kaufman used "Shul With a Pool" as the title of his 1999 book, in which he called Abramson "a leading architect of the synagogue-center building boom," noting that he also worked on the fundraising, running a campaign for the Young Women's Hebrew Association in 1912 that raised $200,000 (equivalent to $4.82 million in 2025).

According to Jewish historian Jacob J. Schacter, the Jewish Center was an invention of wealthy Jews living in New York's fashionable Upper West Side and Yorkville neighborhoods in the late 19th and early 20th centuries. New York Rabbi Mordecai M. Kaplan envisioned transforming the synagogue "from solely a place of prayer to also a place of recreation: from a congregation to a Jewish center ... a place for Bible and basketball, Gemara and games, learning and luncheons, prayer and ping-pong."

Abramson's influence can be seen in the Ocean Parkway Jewish Center, designed by Samuel Malkind and Martyn Weinsten. One aspect of Abramson's work was using traditional Judaic symbols in the ornamentation of neo-Classical design. Malkind had worked as the head draftsman in Abramson's office early in his career, and followed Abramson's lead in this respect.

=== 86th Street Jewish Center ===
86th Street Jewish Center architectural rendering, 1918

Abramson designed the Jewish Center at 131 West 86th Street in Manhattan. Built in 1917–1920, this 10-story brick and stone building is part of the Upper West Side / Central Park West Historic District and has been variously described as being in the Neo-Renaissance style or Italian Renaissance styles. As the center included an Orthodox synagogue, the seating areas for men and women were to be separated from each other. The arrangement commonly used at the time had women seated in an upstairs gallery; in this case, the men and women were on the same level, separated by a partition known as a mehitza. As well as a large synagogue, the building was to include a second smaller one, an auditorium, clubrooms, handball and squash courts, a swimming pool on the sixth floor, and space for a possible Turkish bath to be installed later.

In February 1917, the building was described as being planned to be 8 stories tall (a 1919 report says 10), 66 by 100 feet (20 m × 30 m) on a 77 by 100.8 feet (23.5 m × 30.7 m) lot which had been purchased the previous April. At that time, the structure was estimated to cost $350,000 ($5.8 million in 2025) after purchase of the land. The cornerstone was laid on August 5. By February 1918, when the building was almost finished up to the fourth floor, construction costs were said to have been $150,000 ($2.5 million in 2025), and the lot as being 60 by 100 feet (18 m × 30 m). Planned future work included the addition of the gymnasium, pool, baths, sleeping accommodations, as well as a banquet hall and associated kitchens and pantries. A temporary certificate of occupancy was issued on March 1, 1918, noting that the remaining construction was to be completed within five years. The first services were held on March 22–23, 1918, and the building was officially dedicated on March 24. The expansion to 10 stories was announced in July 1919, with six additional stories to be added at a cost of approximately $175,000 ($2.4 million in 2025).

=== Brooklyn Jewish Center ===
The Brooklyn Jewish Center at 667 Eastern Parkway between New York and Brooklyn Avenues was built in 1922, designed by Abramson in collaboration with Margon & Glasser. Francis Morrone, an architectural historian, describes it as being a long building, suitable to the site:

The lower portion is fully rusticated, as are the end bays of the upper portion, creating exactly the kind of rhythm that is so necessary along a wide, long boulevard [...] As a building tailored to its location, it could hardly be improved.

Morrone compares the design to the nearby Bishop McDonnell Memorial High School, which he says similarly fits into the Eastern Parkway environment. The building, which included a synagogue, gymnasium, catering facilities, classrooms, and a swimming pool, was built on 11 lots.

=== Young Israel of Flatbush ===
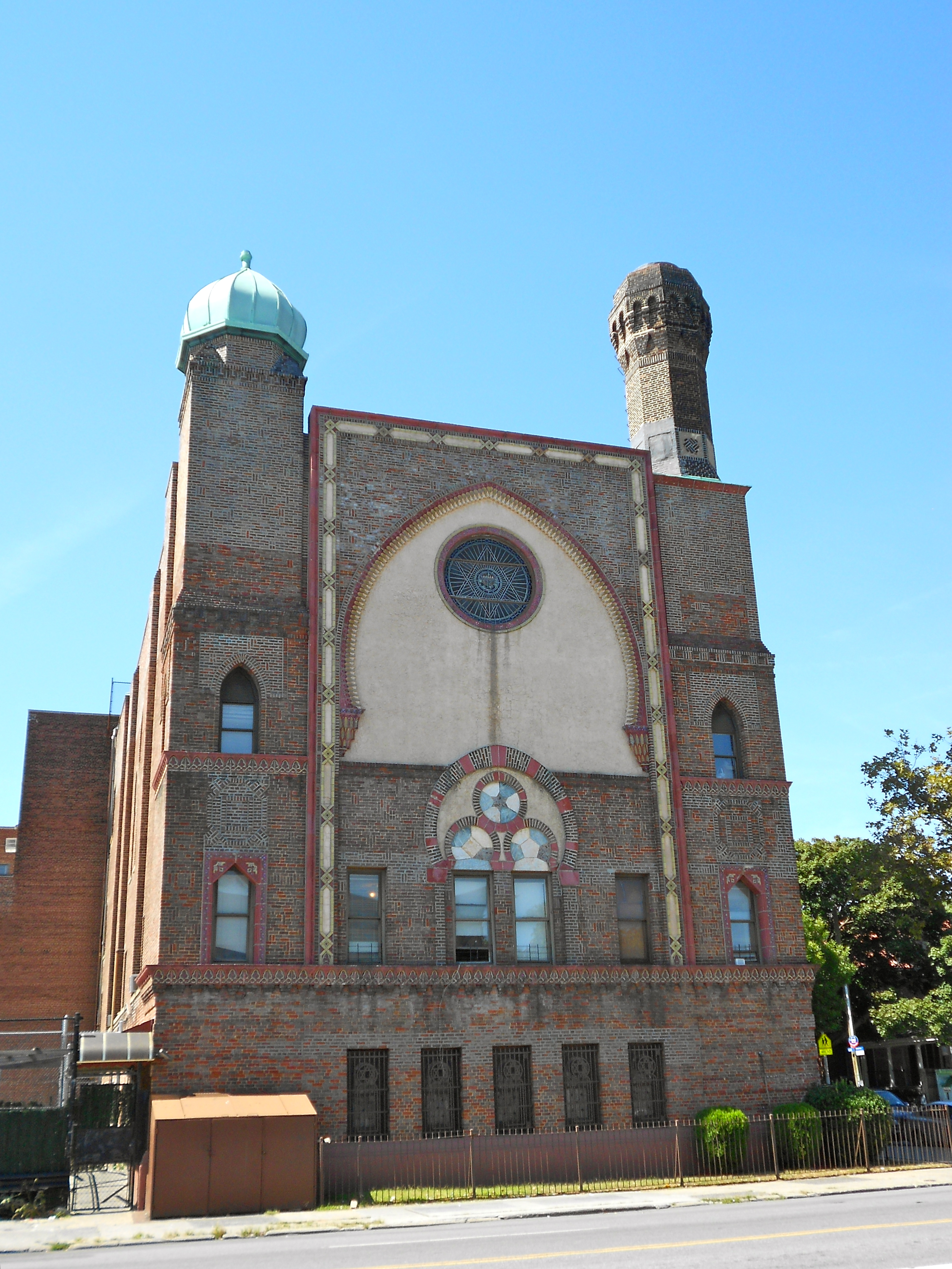
Young Israel of Flatbush

Built in 1923, Abramson's Young Israel of Flatbush building at 1012 Avenue I in Brooklyn incorporated both Jewish and Moorish elements, using a Moorish revival style. Architectural historian Anthony Robbins referred to this style of architecture, which originated in mid-19th century Europe, as "Semitic". According to Robbins, the style reflected a belief that the Moorish influences expressed Judaism's eastern cultural origins better than previous styles based on churches. This style was also used for contemporary Jewish buildings in Brooklyn by Shampan & Shampan in their 1920 Temple Beth-El of Borough Park at 4802 15th Avenue, and by Tobias Goldstone in his 1928 Kol Israel at 603 St. Johns Place.

The building was listed on the National Register of Historic Places in 2010. Moorish details in Abramson's design included slender minarets, arches in both ogival and horseshoe styles, and polychromatic tile and brick. The Avenue I façade uses purple, red, and brown brick laid in irregular geometric patterns. In addition to these Moorish details are more traditional Jewish motifs including the Magen David (six-pointed star of David) and Hebrew inscriptions.

An entrance vestibule and the synagogue office are on the first floor. The second floor includes a public space and classrooms. The main sanctuary on the third floor is two stories tall with large polychromatic leaded glass windows including both geometric patterns and the names of the twelve tribes from Jewish tradition to provide light. The basement was built as a gymnasium and in later years doubled as an auditorium.

=== Astoria Center of Israel ===
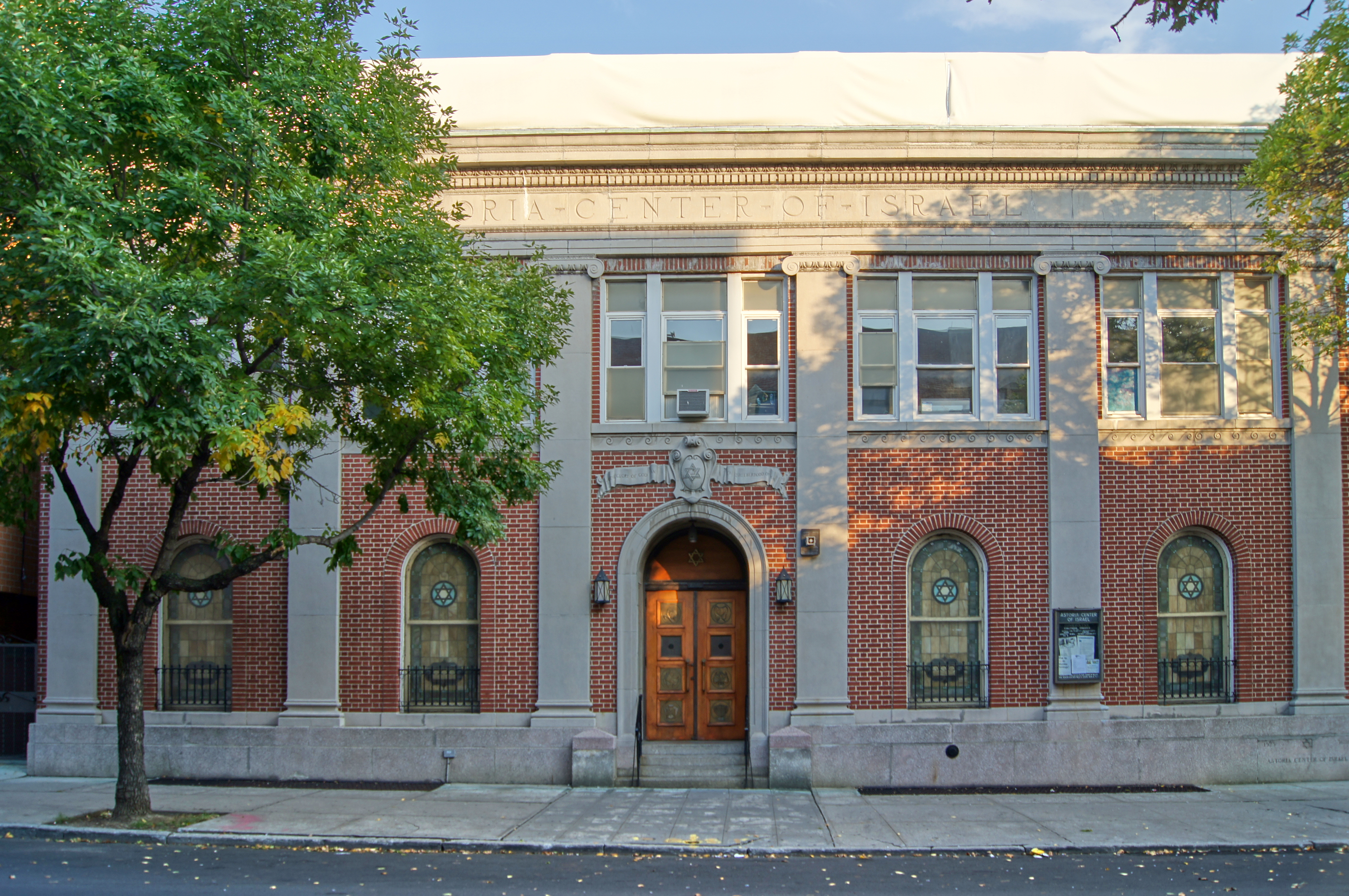
Astoria Center of Israel in 2012

Abramson designed the Astoria Center of Israel, a synagogue located at 27–35 Crescent Street in Astoria, Queens. The two-story building was built in 1925–1926 as a religious school and community center associated with the adjacent Congregation Mishkan Israel synagogue and continues to be used for its original purpose. The building was listed on the National Register of Historic Places in 2009. It is two stories high with a façade of Flemish-bond striated red brick trimmed in cast stone designed to look like limestone, sitting on a masonry foundation. As with many American synagogues built in the 1920s, the design incorporates classical detailing along with Judaic symbols: the Magen David, a menorah, a kiddush cup, and hands in the traditional blessing gesture of the Kohanim.

== 116 John Street ==
In 1930, developer Julian Kovacs purchased adjacent lots at 1 Platt Street and 114 John Place in a sub-section of Manhattan's Financial District where many insurance companies have their offices. The lots totaled 11,000 square feet (1,000 m^{2}) with existing low-rise structures. Kovacs hired Abramson to design an office tower which was ultimately constructed as 116 John Street; the Art Deco 35-story office building is listed on the National Register of Historic Places.

Despite the stock market crash a year earlier, real estate development was ongoing in this area, Art Deco designs being popular, as an elegant expression of the Modernist style. Abramson's design included elements of Cubism and Futurism such as chevron patterns in the metal spandrels between the first and second stories, with setbacks as required by New York City's 1916 zoning code.

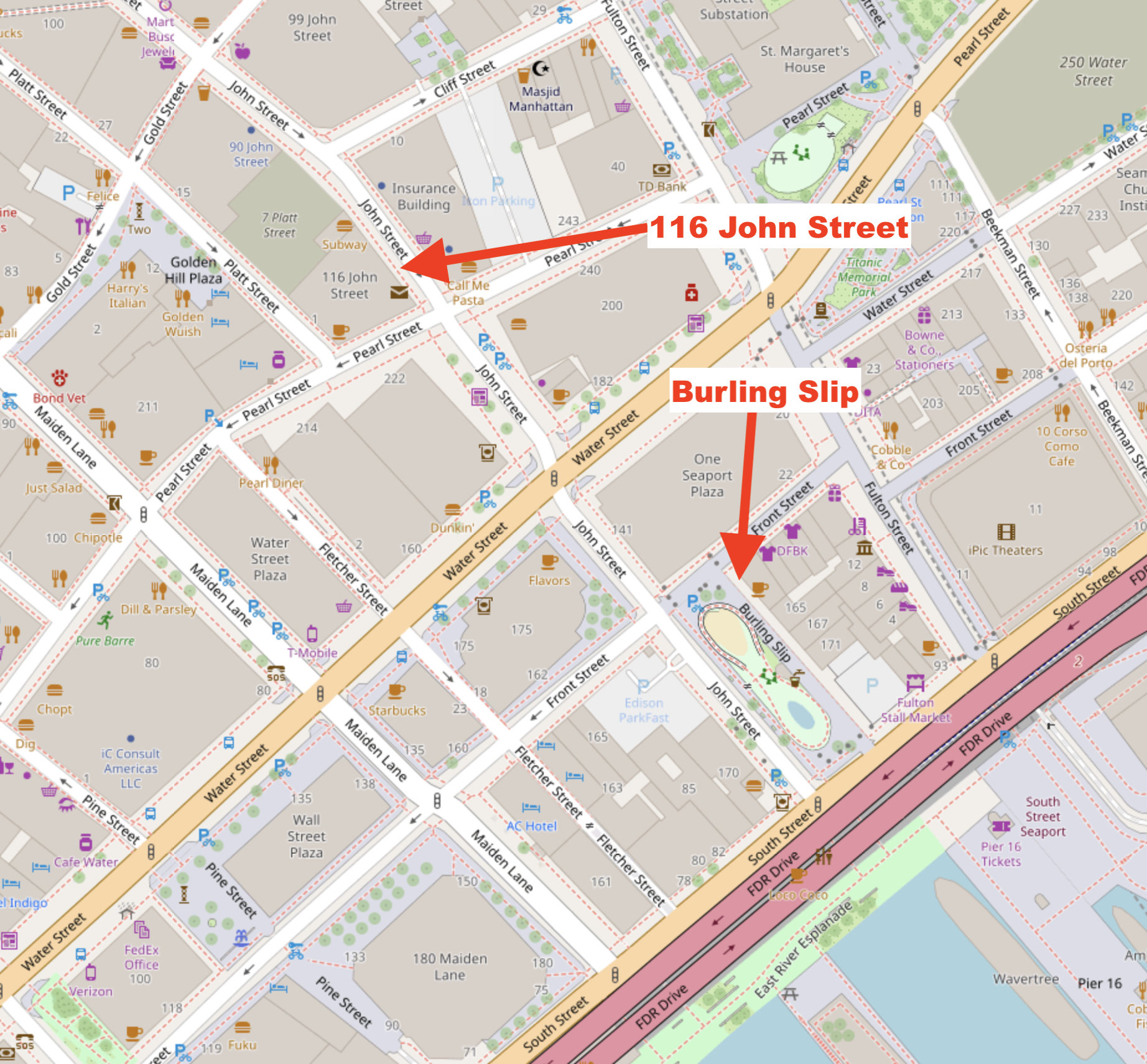
Locations of Burling Slip and 116 John Street

Shortly after construction began, a lawsuit was filed by the owners of the adjacent 111 John Street claiming that the setbacks were insufficient. Based on the width of the street, the suit claimed that the first setback should be at approximately 130 feet (40 m) instead of the planned 250 feet (76 m). The developers of 116 John Street claimed that the setbacks were appropriate based on proximity to the wider public space at Burling Slip. By this time, the foundation had already been completed, contracts for 90% of the required steel had already been issued, and several leases had been signed. The suit was dismissed on the basis that it had not been filed soon enough and the cost to correct the problem would be excessive, but the judge did comment that the law should be clarified to prevent future disputes of a similar nature. A 1988 lawsuit during the construction of 108 East 96th Street cited similar concerns.

== Restaurants ==
Abramson designed two restaurants for Horn & Hardart in 1931, both Automats done in a modern style to meet Horn & Hardart's preference. The first, at 155 West 33rd Street in midtown Manhattan, described by New York City Landmarks Preservation Commission historian Jay Shockley as "fanciful", had a two-story façade finished in terra-cotta with abstract grillework, floral ornamentation, and indirect lighting. The interiors were relatively simple, but picked up many of these decorative elements. In a 1980 interview with Anthony Robbins, Abramson said he had not understood what the client was asking for, so he "simply designed what he liked". The second, at 611 West 181st Street in Washington Heights, followed the design concept used by Charles Platt in his Horn & Hardart at 2710–2714 Broadway and was described by Robbins as "one of the most extravagant of all New York's Automats". The interior was adorned with scenes of modern New York; of particular note were panels in the colored glass ceilings in which "the [recently constructed] Chrysler and Empire State Buildings [...] rose towards each other, their spires meeting electrically over a central schematic diagram of the Manhattan street grid."

Starting in 1934, Abramson designed six restaurants for the Longchamps chain in collaboration with artist Winold Reiss. Abramson worked on the exteriors, with Reiss producing images related to New York City for the interiors. American Architect and Architecture magazine wrote of the collaboration:

For the past two years the happily collaborative talents of an architect and a painter have resulted in better appearance and better business for a well-established chain of New York restaurants. Fairly standard in basic elements of form, each restaurant is decorated around a different theme. The most recent in this group uses as its central motif the historical contrasts of New York City. The façade, mainly of plate glass and satin-finished chromium, has its structural parts decorated with glass mosaics in blue, silver, and off-white.

Abramson designed the Brass Rail restaurant at Idlewild Airport (later renamed John F. Kennedy International Airport), located in the Temporary Terminal Building, a quonset hut type structure. Jerry Spampanato of the Metro Airport News described it as "a restaurant ahead of its time", with the carving station visible as you entered the building.

== World's Fair ==
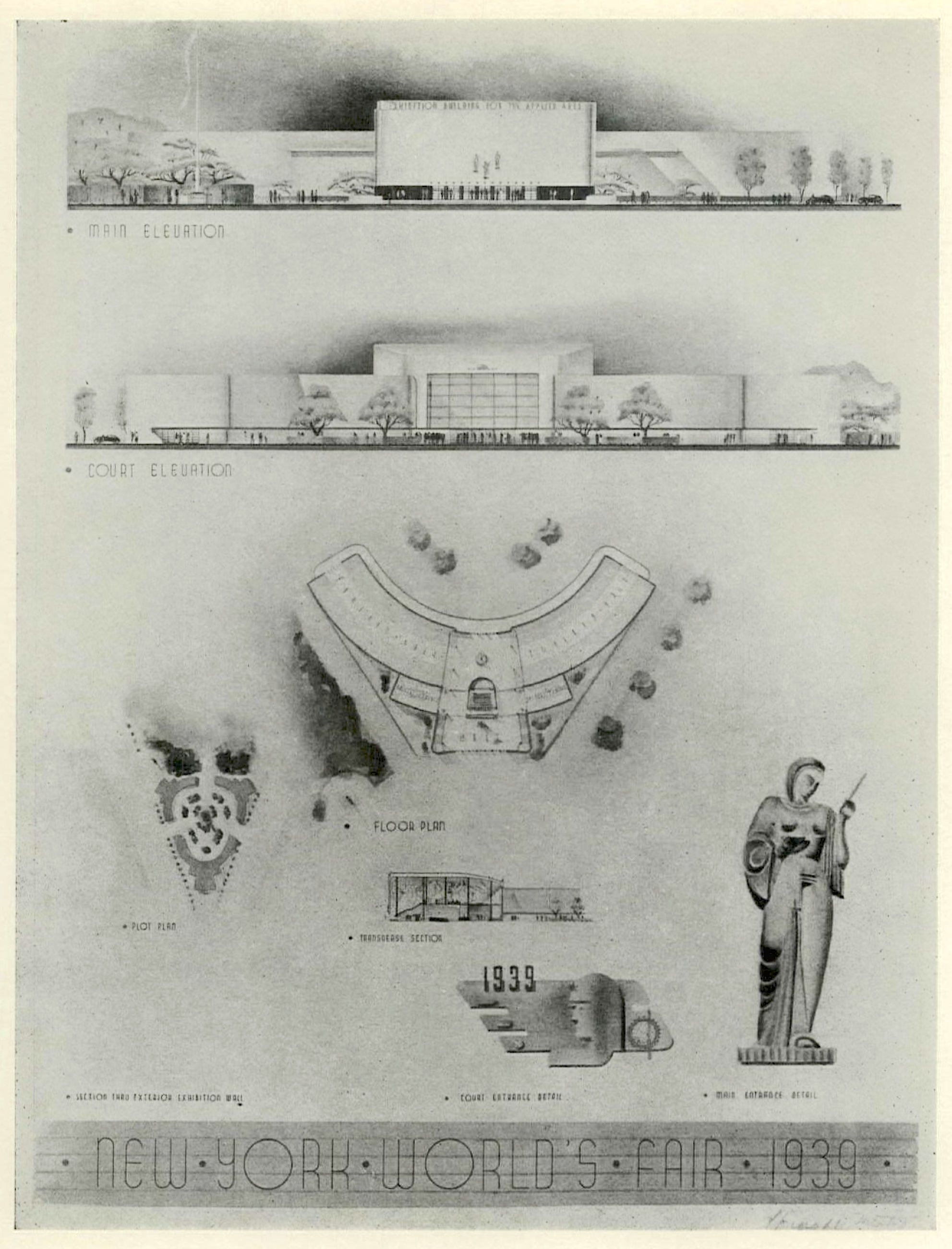
Abramson's design sketches for the 1939 World's Fair

In collaboration with Voorhees, Gmelin & Walker, Abramson designed the Brass Rail concessions at the 1939 New York World's Fair. There were several of these on the fair grounds, offering service at either a food bar or tables.

Although the Brass Rail design was successful, not all of Abramson's designs were as well received. In 1936, he submitted a sketch to a design competition for the fair. The competition asked for building designs which could be used for applied arts exhibits, with limits on interior and exterior dimensions, to be sited with two other exhibit buildings grouped in a three-sided plot. In a review of the submissions, Pencil Points editor Kenneth Reid criticized Abramson's work, saying that it forced visitors to either retrace their steps in opposition to the overall traffic flow or make two passes through the gallery to see all the exhibits. Reid also said that Abramson tried too hard to make the design modern, resulting in simple elevations.

== Riviera nightclub ==
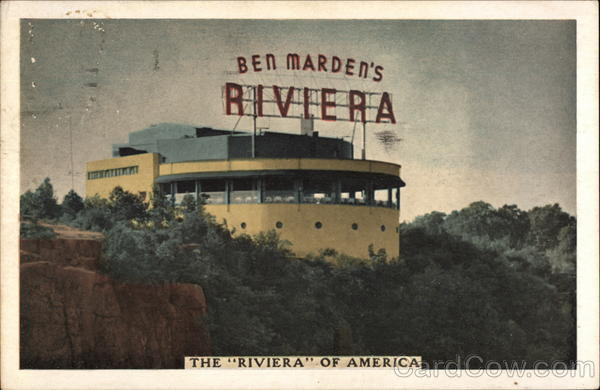
Ben Marden's Riviera, c. 1937–1939

A 1937 commission was the Riviera nightclub in Fort Lee, New Jersey, built for entertainment entrepreneur Ben Marden. The club was atop the Palisades, with views of the Hudson River, the George Washington Bridge, and Manhattan. Seating capacity was almost 1000 people. Despite the engineering difficulties presented by the solid rock of the Palisades, and contrary to Abramson's advice, Marden insisted on the building having a full basement, requiring the use of dynamite to excavate a hole approximately 200 by 150 feet (61 m × 46 m) and 13 feet (4.0 m) deep, which was finished with reinforced concrete. The basement was required for the mechanical and hydraulic equipment which operated a revolving stage and bandstand on the floor above. It also housed a large kitchen with extensive refrigerated storage space, a wine cellar, a barber shop, a massage parlor, and a tailor shop. Construction costs were estimated at $250,000 ($4.4 million in 2025).

In Bill Miller's Riviera, Tom Austin and Ron Kase describe the main floor of the building as having been designed with a nautical theme, resembling the bridge of an ocean liner. According to Anthony Robbins, Marden had wanted a traditional design based on George Washington's home in Mount Vernon, Virginia, but Abramson didn't like this idea so designed a modern structure instead and hid the details from Marden until construction was too far along to do anything about it.

The exterior walls were reinforced block and concrete covered in stucco with the front at the edge of the Palisades cliff, and an Art Deco entrance at the rear, elevated five steps above a sweeping driveway. The semi-circular building included unbroken expanses of glass to take advantage of the views, and the roof of the building could be opened to the sky on clear nights. A year after the club opened, Abramson added a series of abstract murals widely attributed to Arshile Gorky. Austin and Kase note that the oils, watercolors, and murals were actually done by Saul Schary, who shared Gorky's abstract style. Gorky had done some paintings for Marden's previous club, also called the Riviera, which was lost in a fire. Marden had asked Gorky to paint the murals for his new club, and Gorky produced some drawings, but it was Schary who ultimately did the work.

The building was rumored to contain an illegal hidden gambling parlor. According to Austin and Kase, those in on the secret would enter through a janitor's closet; a mechanism therein would retract a wall, exposing a winding staircase leading to another level of the building where the casino was located. The club was closed in 1953 and demolished in 1954 when the Palisades Interstate Parkway was built.

== Other buildings ==
=== New Israel Hospital ===
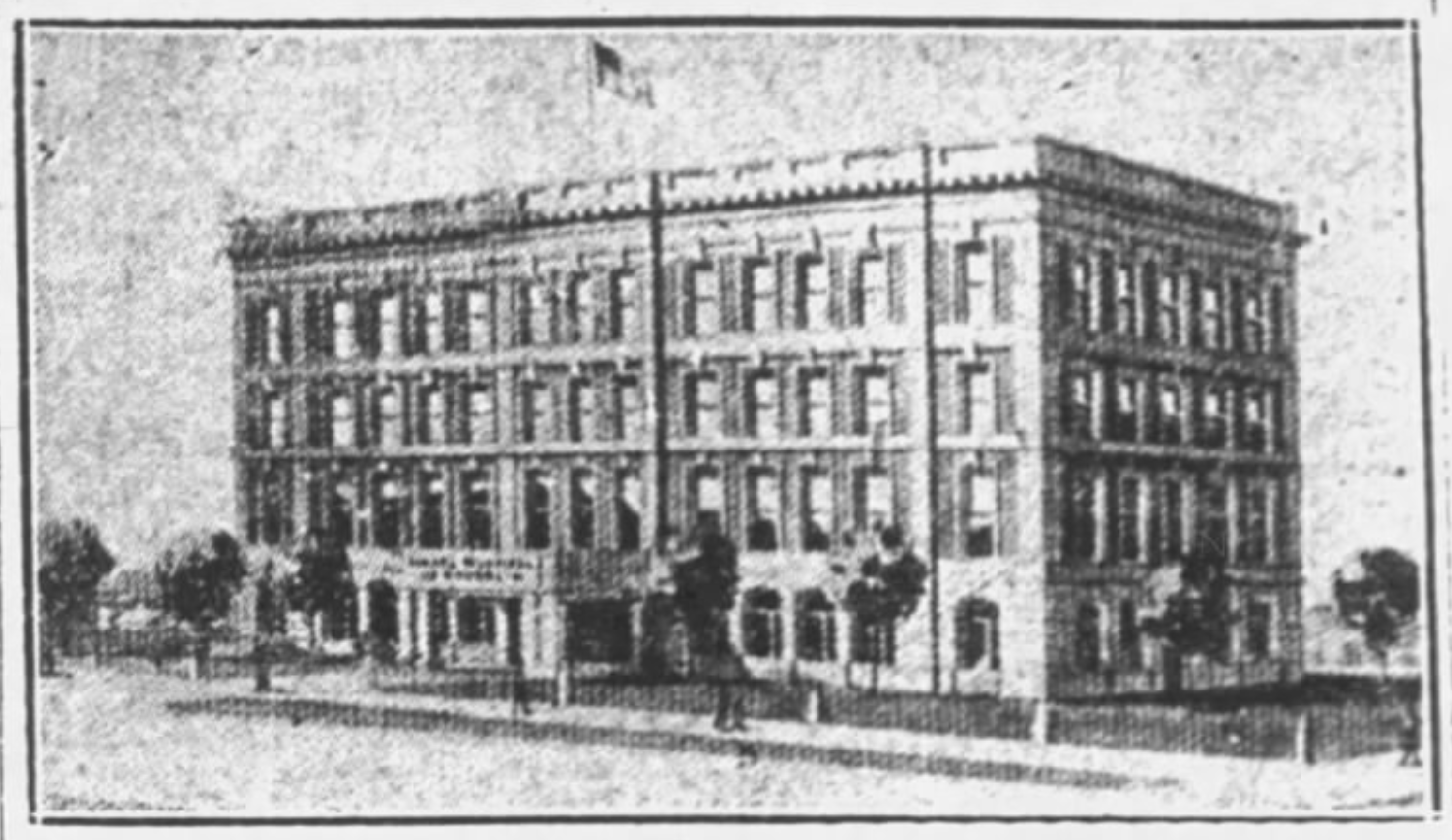
Architectural rendering of the proposed New Israel Hospital

In 1919 (by which time he had acquired a reputation for designing hospital buildings) Abramson designed a four-story building for the Israel Hospital in Brooklyn, to be located on Tenth Avenue, occupying the entire 200-foot (61 m) block between 48th and 49th Streets. With a capacity for 200 patients, this building was to provide expansion space for the New Utrecht Dispensary (which later became Maimonides Medical Center). Construction cost was originally estimated in May 1919 to be about $250,000 ($3.5 million in 2025) which grew to $400,000 ($5.5 million in 2025) by September of that year.

=== 210 West 78th Street ===
Built in 1926, Abramson designed a nine-story apartment building at 210 West 78th Street. The building was in the Tudor style, with a façade of irregular brick with stucco panels framed by wooden strips and a roof featuring peaked gables. It was built at a time when Manhattan's West Side was undergoing extensive development and replaced houses previously numbered 206–212. The previous year, Schwartz & Gross had designed another nine-story building facing it across the street at number 215, which similarly replaced houses at 211–217. Both of these buildings were set back 5 feet (1.5 m) from the standard building line, complying with a covenant dating back to 1887.

=== Harlem branch library ===
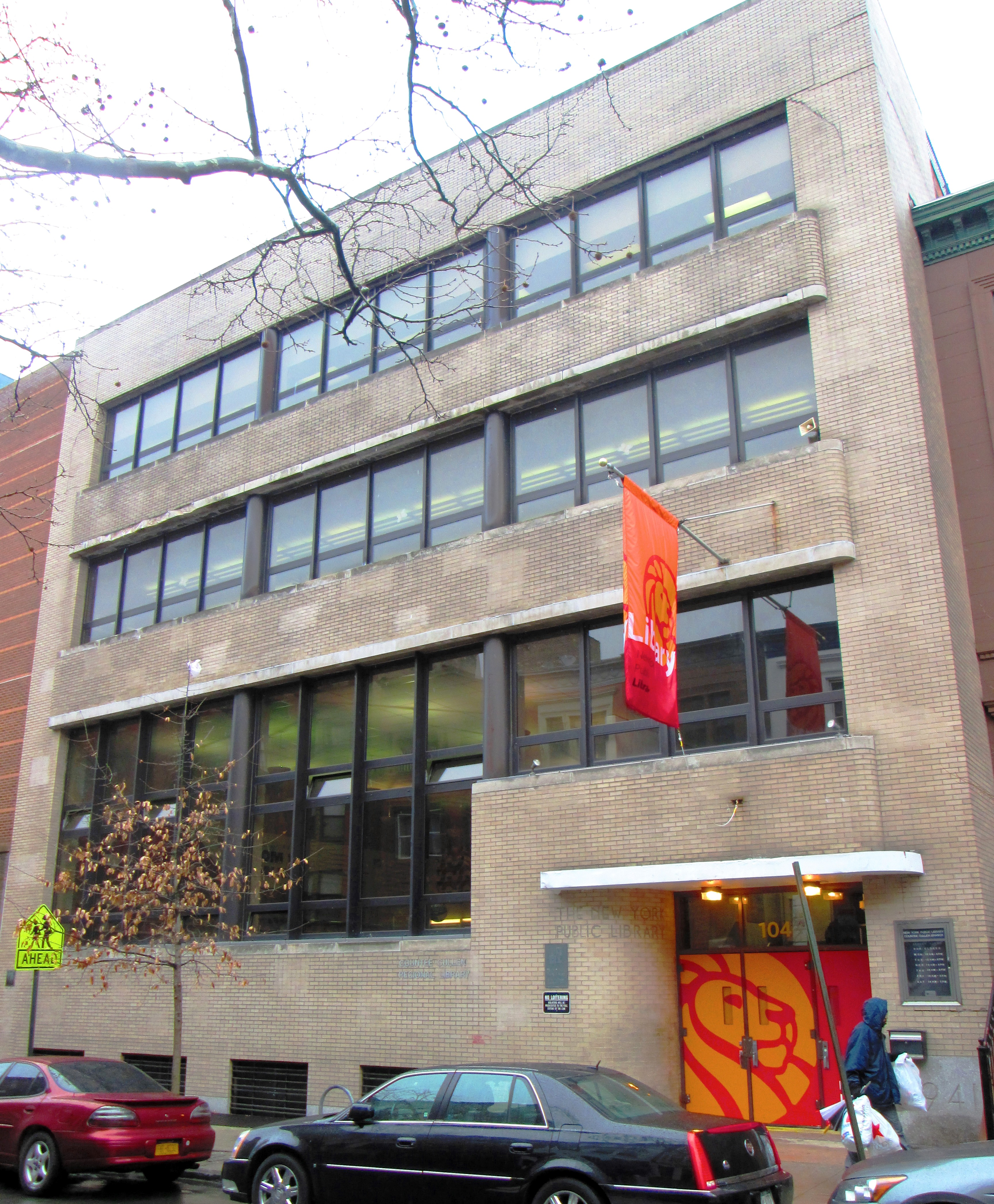
Countee Cullen Branch

In 1941, Abramson designed an Art Moderne addition to 103 West 135th Street, which at the time was known as the West 135th Street branch or Harlem branch of the New York Public Library. This doubled the size of the original 1905 McKim, Mead & White building, extending it to 104 West 136th Street, occupying the site of two townhouses previously owned by Madam C. J. Walker. The cornerstone was laid on October 28, 1941, with construction expected to be completed in early 1942 at a cost of approximately $200,000 ($3.4 million in 2025). As of 2024 this is known as the Countee Cullen Library, honoring American writer Countee Cullen, and is part of the larger Schomburg Center for Research in Black Culture, which was designated a New York City landmark in 1981.

As well as the usual library spaces such as book stacks and reading rooms, the design included a lecture hall for community events, an art gallery on the mezzanine floor, and a dedicated acoustically corrected room for listening to the library's music collection. The modern style with lack of adornment was intended to entice people into the building; in a 1946 review, Abramson wrote "The exterior was conceived to express the building's function in terms of stark simplicity, to the end that it might allay shyness and dispel reluctance to enter the building".

=== Personal residence ===
Abramson bought a property on Indian Hill Road in Yorktown, New York, in 1945 for his personal use as a country retreat. The property came with an undistinguished Cape Cod–style house, which he incrementally expanded to include stone walls, stairways, and porches to provide better views of the surrounding area. Abramson sold the property in 1984. In 2017, the house was listed as a Home of Historic Distinction by the Yorktown Landmarks Preservation Commission.

== Later life ==
Abramson retired in 1973. He was described in that year as still being active at the age of 84, tall, well-built, and giving the appearance of being in his 50s. He died on January 15, 1985, at St. Vincent's Hospital and Medical Center in Manhattan at the age of 97. He is survived by his wife Pearl and two daughters, Anita Claire from Coconut Creek, Florida, and Judith Abramson of Manhattan as well as two grandchildren and five great-grandchildren.
