= Mariam Veiszadeh =

Afghan-born Australian lawyer (born 1984)

- مريم ويس زاده
- Born: Mariam Zamiri Veiszadeh; 1984 (age 41–42); Kabul, Afghanistan
- Education: Western Sydney University (LLB, BEc)
- Occupations: Lawyer; Activist
- Website: mariamveiszadeh.com

Mariam Zamiri Veiszadeh (born 1984) is an Afghan-born Australian lawyer and writer, known for her anti-racism campaigns.

== Early life and education ==
Mariam Zamiri Veiszadeh was born in Kabul, Afghanistan, in 1984. In 1988, when Veiszadeh was four years old, her family fled Afghanistan during the Soviet–Afghan War. Her family arrived in Australia in 1990 via India, the Czech Republic, and Germany, and were granted asylum in 1991 under the Refugee and Special Humanitarian Program.

Veiszadeh earned a dual Bachelor of Laws and Bachelor Economics degree from Western Sydney University.

== Advocacy ==
She is the founder and former president of Islamophobia Register Australia, which describes itself as "a secure and reliable service that allows people from across Australia to report any form of Anti-Muslim abuse", and an official Ambassador for Welcome to Australia and Participate Australia.

A member of the Australian Muslim community, she has been described as a "typically assertive Australian woman" by ABC News.

== Recognition ==
In December 2015, Veiszadeh was awarded the "Role Model of the Year" and "Woman of the Year" at the 9th Australian Muslim Achievement Awards.

== Trolling campaign ==
In 2015, Veiszadeh became a victim of Joshua Ryne Goldberg, who was later convicted in the U.S. of attempting a bombing on the 14th anniversary of 9/11 a few years later. He promoted an illusory friendship between Australi Witness (his pro-ISIL Twitter account) and Veiszadeh, with the objective of smearing Veiszadeh's reputation. He aimed to smear people and organisations he saw as being enemies of free speech, including the Human Rights Law Centre and Amnesty International.
