= Bosch Fawstin =

American cartoonist and anti-islam activist

- Born: July 31, 1970 (age 56); The Bronx, New York, U.S.
- Occupation: Cartoonist
- Years active: 2004–present
- Website: boschfawstin.com

Bosch Fawstin (born July 31, 1970) is an American cartoonist and anti-Islam activist who is known for drawing the Islamic prophet Muhammad. Born a Muslim, his parents came from Albania. Fawstin left the religion and now describes himself as a "radical critic of Islam". He won a controversial Muhammad cartoon contest in 2015 that saw the Curtis Culwell Center attack take place.

== Early and personal life ==
Fawstin was born and raised in the Bronx, New York City by Albanian Muslim parents. He says he "phased out of Islam" in his mid-teens when he "began to think about morality in a serious way [and] saw the contrast between Islamic values and American values", and that the September 11 attacks later was a turning point for him. He has also cited the Jyllands-Posten Muhammad cartoons controversy as a strong influence of his views in "defense of free speech". After leaving Islam, he has identified as an atheist, and embraced Ayn Rand's philosophy of Objectivism. He began taking night classes at the School of Visual Arts when he was 25 in order to pursue a career of making comic books.

== Career ==
His first graphic novel, Table for One, was nominated for a Russ Manning Most Promising Newcomer Award in 2004 and an Eisner Award for Talent Deserving of Wider Recognition in 2005, and was endorsed by Alex Toth, a cartoonist greatly admired by Fawstin. The story takes place in one night in an Italian restaurant, Fawstin having a background working in the restaurant trade himself.

I draw Mohammed because the enemy tells me I can’t.

— Bosch Fawstin, National Review, 2016

Fawstin first began drawing Muhammad after the Jyllands-Posten Muhammad cartoons controversy in 2006, then after Molly Norris was forced into hiding for announcing the "Everybody Draw Mohammed Day" in 2010, again after the offices of Charlie Hebdo were firebombed in 2011, and following the Charlie Hebdo massacre in 2015, which led to the 2015 Muhammad cartoon contest.

In 2015, he won a controversial contest hosted by the American Freedom Defense Initiative, advertised as the "First Annual Muhammad Art Exhibit and Contest" featuring drawings of Muhammad. The event saw the Curtis Culwell Center attack by two armed Islamist terrorists take place, claimed as the first attack by the Islamic State of Iraq and the Levant (ISIL) in the United States. Both attackers were killed by SWAT officers. Fawstin stated that he had received death threats for his cartoons before then, but denied reports in The Wall Street Journal that he went into hiding following the attack.

Fawstin also published the semi-biographical The Infidel, featuring Pigman, a three-part comic book that is part of a graphic novel. The plot "revolves around twin brothers who react to 9/11 in opposite ways: One dives deeper into his Islamic roots; the other, a Muslim apostate, creates 'an ex-Muslim counter-jihad superhero comic book.' It is a story within a story: As the superhero, Pigman, battles his jihadist nemesis, the conflict between the twins escalates." He was interviewed on The Daily Show in 2011 regarding his criticism of comic book character Nightrunner, while also featuring his own comic.

Fawstin has also been identified as a blogger of the counter-jihad movement, and as a frequent contributor to FrontPage Magazine. He was listed as an anti-Muslim "active hate group" by the Southern Poverty Law Center in 2016 and 2017.

He appeared in two documentary films about free speech in 2016 and 2017—Silenced: Our War on Free Speech produced by Mike Cernovich, and Can’t We Talk About This directed by Pamela Geller. In 2018, he was announced as the judge of a Muhammad cartoon contest to be hosted by Dutch politician Geert Wilders. The contest was eventually cancelled over safety concerns, but held the next year.

He published the two-volume Peaceful Death Threats in 2019, which compiled some of the thousands of death threats he has received from Muslims.

In 2020, he illustrated a Danish book about the Quran titled De skyggefulde haver by Kåre Bluitgen, as it was no longer possible to find any cartoonist willing to draw Muhammad in Denmark. The book was billed as the "first illustrated Quran in the world".

Fawstin stated to have drawn Muhammad over three hundred times by 2020.

As of 2025, he was part of Comicsgate, and was crowdfunding PIGMAN #1, a remaster of his two first original The Infidel, featuring Pigman comics.

== Works ==
- Table for One. Mainspring Comics. 2004. ISBN 978-0974955803.
- ProPiganda: Drawing the Line Against Jihad. O'Ink Comics. 2009. ISBN 978-0974955810.
- The Infidel, featuring Pigman #1: The Trigger. O'Ink Comics. 2011. ASIN B015YJ0AD8.
- The Infidel, featuring Pigman #2: War of Words. O'Ink Comics. 2013. ASIN B015ZZEZH8.
- Robinson, Cary; Fawstin, Bosch (illustrator) (2014). Monsters In My Yard. Golden Hound. ISBN 978-0989060042.
- The Infidel, featuring Pigman #3: Reprisal. O'Ink Comics. 2015. ASIN B0160CE03Y.
- My Mohammad Cartoons. Vol. 1–2. O'Ink Comics. 2018–19.
- Peaceful Death Threats. Vol. 1–2. O'Ink Comics. 2019.
- Islam Bitches. O'Ink Comics. 2019.
- Bluitgen, Kåre; Fawstin, Bosch (illustrator) (2020). De skyggefulde haver (in Danish). Forlaget Tøkk. ISBN 978-8793141636.
- Infidel, P. R.; Fawstin, Bosch (illustrator) (2022). Tales of American Idiocy. Liberty Hill. ISBN 978-1662860737.
