= Mujahid Miski =

Somali militant

Mujahid Miski (born Muhammed Abdullahi Hassan) is a Somali permanent resident of the United States wanted by the FBI for providing material support to the Somalia-based terrorist group al-Shabaab.

Miski reportedly left Minnesota for Somalia as a teenager in 2008 to join al-Shabaab. Miski has been an active propagandist and recruiter for ISIS and al-Shabaab on Twitter, leading the Counter Extremism Project (CEP) to call on Twitter to permanently block his accounts.

Miski had reportedly been in contact "for months" with Elton Simpson, one of the two shooters responsible for the May 3, 2015 attack on the American Freedom Defense Initiative's "Muhammad Art Exhibit and Cartoon Contest" in Garland, Texas.

On December 7, 2015, the U.S. State Department issued a statement saying that Miski had "surrendered to the Federal Government of Somalia on November 6, 2015."
