= Mike Wendling =

British journalist

Mike Wendling is a BBC journalist, with the job title US National Digital Reporter, and author of the books Alt-Right: From 4chan to the White House and Day of Reckoning How the Far Right Declared War on Democracy. In 2016, Wendling wrote about subjects including American right-wing social media star Tomi Lahren and a factory that was the first to outsource jobs away from the United States.

He was also contacted by the American terrorist Joshua Ryne Goldberg, and interviewed antifa activists and Proud Boys members in Portland, Oregon.

He is based in London as of 2026 and is originally from western New York State.

In 2020, Wendling co-founded the BBC's disinformation unit.
