= 2015 Curtis Culwell Center attack =

Failed terrorist attack in Texas, U.S.

Curtis Culwell Center attack
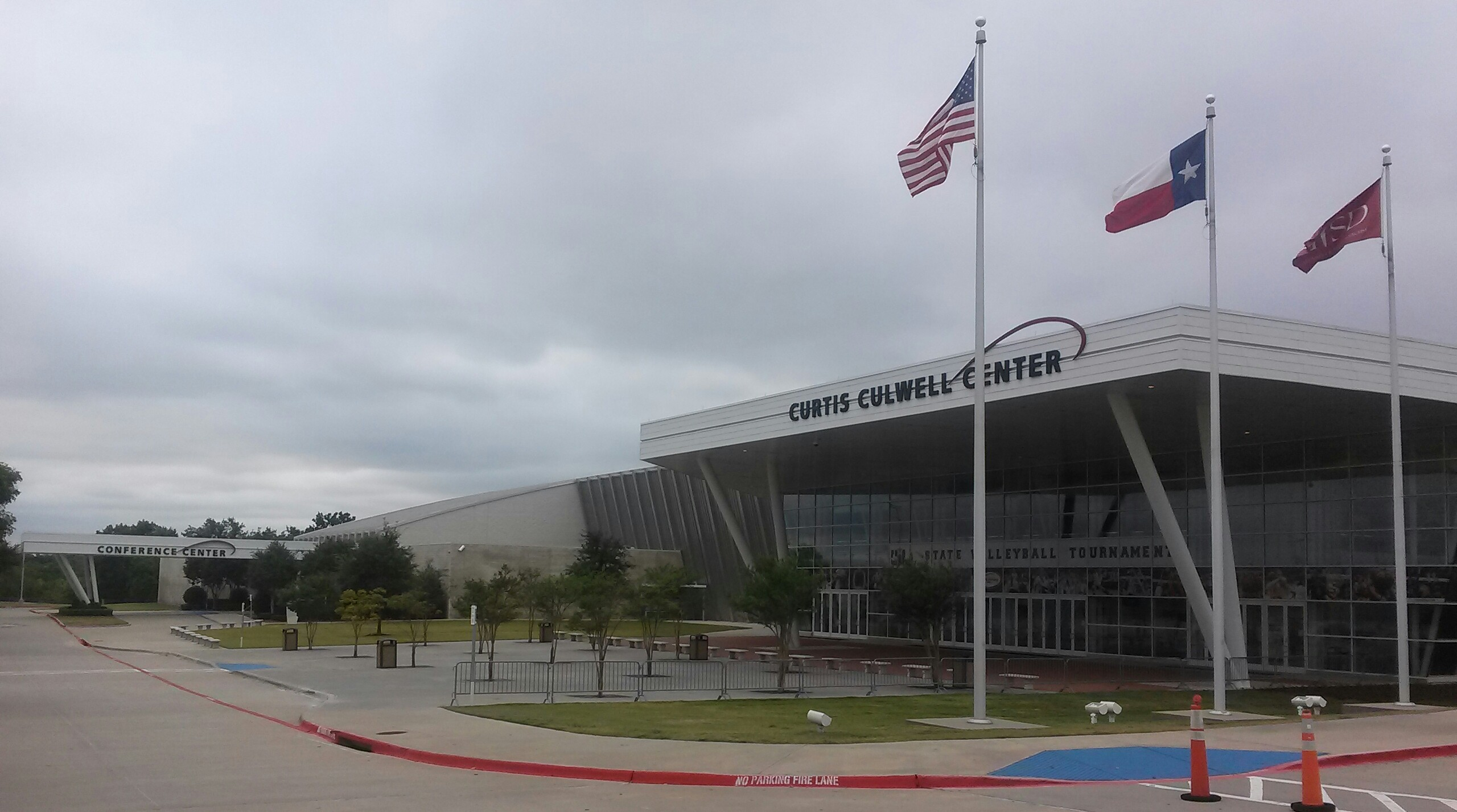
- Curtis Culwell Center
- Location: 32.95956°N 96.64191°W; Garland, Texas, U.S.
- Date: May 3, 2015; 6:50 p.m. (UTC−05:00)
- Target: American Freedom Defense Initiative exhibition
- Attack type: Shooting, terrorist attack
- Weapons: Three semi-automatic rifles: Elk River Arms (Elk River Tool & Die, Inc.) ERTD M74 (5.45 × 39 mm); Romarm/Cugir Draco (7.62 × 39 mm); Kel-Tec SUB-2000 (9 mm); Three handguns: Hi-Point C9 (9 mm); Taurus Model 605; Jimenez Arms JA-9 (9 mm)
- Deaths: 2 (both perpetrators)
- Injuries: 1 (security officer)
- Perpetrators: Elton Simpson and Nadir Soofi
- Motive: Islamic extremism, Retaliation for depictions of Muhammad

The Curtis Culwell Center attack was a failed terrorist attack on an exhibit featuring cartoon images of Muhammad at the Curtis Culwell Center in Garland, Texas, United States, on May 3, 2015, which ended in a shootout with police guarding the event, and the deaths of the two perpetrators. The attackers shot an unarmed Garland Independent School District (GISD) security officer in the ankle. Shortly after opening fire, both attackers were shot by an off-duty Garland police officer and killed by SWAT.

The FBI had been monitoring the two attackers for years, and an undercover agent was right behind them when the first shots were fired. The injured security guard filed a lawsuit against the FBI in October 2017, claiming the FBI was partially responsible for his injuries.

The Islamic State of Iraq and the Levant (ISIL) claimed responsibility for the attack plot, the first time the militant group took credit for an attack in the United States. ISIL's claim of responsibility was not verified, and U.S. officials stated that the attack appears to have been inspired, but not directed, by ISIL.

An online ISIL persona run by internet troll Joshua Ryne Goldberg had posted maps to the exhibition, and urged his followers to attack the event. Goldberg pleaded guilty to federal charges in December 2017. His persona was retweeted by one of the attackers on the morning of the attack, and Goldberg claimed responsibility for inciting the attack to multiple news outlets and in his plea agreement.

== Background ==
=== Muhammad exhibit and contest ===
External image
- Bosch Fawstin's winning Muhammad cartoon

The event, which featured images of Muhammad, was advertised as the "First Annual Muhammad Art Exhibit and Contest", presented by the American Freedom Defense Initiative (AFDI), or Stop Islamization of America. It was organized by the AFDI together with the David Horowitz Freedom Center's Jihad Watch, run by Robert Spencer. A $10,000 award was offered for the winning cartoon, which was selected from among 350 submissions. The prize was awarded to Bosch Fawstin, a former Muslim and a critic of Islam who submitted six drawings, with the text "You can't draw me!"/"That's why I draw you." He was to collect an award of $12,500. Though images of Muhammad are not explicitly banned by the Quran, prominent Islamic views oppose human images, especially those of prophets. Such views have gained ground among certain militant Islamic groups.

The event featured speeches by Pamela Geller, president of the AFDI, and Dutch politician Geert Wilders, party leader of the Party for Freedom and outspoken critic of Islam. Congressmen Keith Ellison and André Carson had tried unsuccessfully to block Wilders from entering the United States. At the time of the attack, the "First Annual Muhammad Art Exhibit and Contest" exhibit was attended by approximately 150 people, although the number was initially estimated at 200.

The organizers of the event had paid over $10,000 to a total of forty off-duty police officers and private security guards. The Federal Bureau of Investigation (FBI), a SWAT team, the Bureau of Alcohol, Tobacco, Firearms and Explosives (ATF), and the Texas Department of Public Safety (DPS) were also brought in for the occasion of any possible incidents. At the time, there was reportedly "no immediate credible threat" of an attack.

Prior to the attack, ISIL had urged followers and sympathizers who were unable to join the fighting in the Syrian civil war to carry out jihad in their home countries. Approximately three hours prior to the start of the contest, the FBI had alerted the Garland Police Department that a suspected extremist, identified as gunman Elton Simpson, was "interested in the event" and could show up there. However, FBI officials later clarified they had no reason to believe an actual attack would occur at the contest. Officers later stated that they were not aware of the alert.

=== Location ===
The "First Annual Muhammad Art Exhibit and Contest" event was hosted at the Curtis Culwell Center, rented from the Garland Independent School District. The center previously hosted a fundraiser in January called "Stand With the Prophet in Honor and Respect", which was organized to combat negative stereotypes of Islam. Geller had spearheaded about 1,000 picketers at that event.

Before the start of the "First Annual Muhammad Art Exhibit and Contest", concerns were expressed by Garland citizens about the center hosting the event due to potential backlash and retaliation, a sentiment that had also been voiced prior to the "Stand With the Prophet in Honor and Respect" event. However, officials allowed both events to proceed as planned, since the school district was bound by a nondiscriminatory leasing policy. Garland ISD board president Rick Lambert said in January, "The Culwell Center is available for rental as long as you comply with the law. Because it is a public facility, the district is not allowed to discriminate based upon viewpoint."

== Attack ==
Minutes prior to the attack, a man, identified by police as one of the gunmen, posted a tweet with the hashtag #texasattack: "May Allah accept us as mujahideen." In his tweet, he said he and an accomplice had pledged allegiance to "Amirul Mu'mineen", which Paul Cruickshank of CNN said probably referred to ISIL leader Abu Bakr al-Baghdadi. The user also asked his readers to follow Junaid Hussain on Twitter. After the shooting occurred, Hussain tweeted: "Allahu Akbar!!!! 2 of our brothers just opened fire".

Just before the event was set to end at around 7:00 p.m., two men wearing body armor and equipped with three rifles, three handguns, and 1,500 rounds of ammunition drove up to a police car that was parked next to a barricade erected in front of the center. Seated inside the police car were Officer Gregory Stevens of the Garland Police Department and an unarmed Garland ISD security guard. The two gunmen got out of their vehicle and fired dozens of rounds at the police car, shooting the Garland ISD security guard. The men were then shot and wounded by Stevens, and eventually killed by SWAT officers. The Garland ISD officer, identified as 58-year-old Bruce Joiner, was shot in the ankle. He was treated at a local hospital and confirmed to be released at 9:00 p.m.

Authorities were worried that the suspects' car could contain an incendiary device; as a precaution, several nearby businesses were evacuated. Bomb units from the Garland Police Department, the FBI, the Plano Police Department, and the Dallas/Fort Worth International Airport were called to the scene. Police cordoned off a large area and at least three helicopters circled overhead. An officer in SWAT gear took the stage toward the end of the event and told attendees that a shooting had occurred, stating that one officer and two suspects had been shot. It was later confirmed that there were no explosives inside the vehicle. After the attack, Phoenix police began searching the two assailants' apartment.

== Perpetrators ==
Elton Simpson (c. 1985 – May 3, 2015) and Nadir Hamid Soofi (c. 1981 – May 3, 2015), roommates living in an apartment in Phoenix, Arizona, were the assailants in the attack. Simpson was convicted of making a false statement about terrorism in 2011, and followed hacker and pro-ISIL propagandist Junaid Hussain on Twitter. Simpson was an employee at a dentist's office, while Soofi was running a carpet cleaning business. A third man, Abdul Malik Abdul Kareem (born c. 1972), was responsible for housing Simpson and Soofi at his home, as well as supplying them with the firearms and ammunition used in the attack. According to an indictment, around June 2014, the three began conspiring to support ISIL and considered targeting a number of locations for terrorist attacks.

=== Elton Simpson ===
Simpson was born in Illinois and raised in suburban Westmont. He moved to Phoenix at a young age. He converted to Islam while attending Washington High School. His lawyer described him as "particularly devout" and "entrenched in Islam", but said he did not seem to be a threat to anyone. Simpson was a longtime worshiper at the Islamic Community Center of Phoenix, starting in approximately 2005, but according to the mosque's president, Usama Shami, he stopped showing up months prior to the attack. The mosque has been part of previous terrorism probes. He attended Yavapai College in Prescott, Arizona, playing basketball for the college there.

Simpson was the subject of an FBI investigation starting in 2006, during which he stated his intent to travel to Somalia and join fellow jihadists. He had ties to Hassan Abujihaad, a former United States Navy sailor arrested in Phoenix and convicted of terrorism-related charges. Abujihaad had been an occasional attendant of the Islamic Community Center of Phoenix.

In May 2009, Simpson told an FBI informant, "I'm telling you, man, we can make it to the battlefield. It's time to roll." He was also recorded saying, "If you get shot, or you get killed, it's [heaven] straightaway. ... That's what we here for ... so why not take that route?" In 2010, one day before Simpson was scheduled to travel to Somalia, he was arrested by federal agents as the result of a four-year investigation. The Islamic Community Center of Phoenix posted cash bond of $100,000 to have him released from custody. Simpson was found guilty of making a false statement regarding international and domestic terrorism, and was sentenced to three years probation and a $600 fine in August 2011 after lying to a federal agent about his travel plans. His lenient sentence was the result of U.S. District Court Judge Mary H. Murguia not finding sufficient evidence to conclude that he planned to join a terrorist organization. He was put on the U.S. federal No Fly List. He had previously intended to travel with others to Syria to fight with ISIL, though his accomplices were arrested during simultaneous FBI raids in San Diego and Minneapolis. Authorities had already opened an investigation of Simpson at the time of the attack.

He also interacted with Junaid Hussain, a British-born hacker and member of ISIL, and Mujahid Miski, an Al-Shabaab recruiter and propagandist of Muslim extremism from Minnesota, via Twitter through "secure communication". Hussain was also the founder of a pro-ISIL hacker group called "CyberCaliphate", which was responsible for a cyber-attack on the United States Central Command's Twitter account in January 2015. A week prior to the attack, Simpson mentioned the "First Annual Muhammad Art Exhibit and Contest" event in a tweet sent to what is believed to be Hassan's Twitter account. Simpson then asked, "When will they ever learn?", and Hassan responded: "The brothers from the Charlie Hebdo attack did their part. It's time for brothers in the #US to do their part." Investigators believe Hussain and Hassan encouraged Simpson to commit an attack on U.S. soil, but also that Simpson assembled the attack plan and targeted the art exhibit on his own accord.

Simpson was identified as the same user who posted a tweet with the hashtag #texasattack: "May Allah accept us as mujahideen." The profile photo on #texasattack was of the late American Salafi imam Anwar al-Awlaki, who had repeatedly called for violence against cartoonists who insulted the Islamic prophet Muhammad prior to being killed in a U.S. drone strike in 2011 in Yemen. Junaid Hussain was identified as the ISIL propagandist whom Simpson recommended his readers to follow in that same tweet.

=== Nadir Soofi ===
Soofi's father, Azam Soofi, is Pakistani, and his mother, Sharon Soofi, is American. According to his mother, he was born at Presbyterian Hospital of Dallas and lived in Garland until age three. The family then moved to Plano, Texas, and then Alabama. His mother, who was raised Catholic, converted to Islam at the request of his father. Soofi was also raised as a Muslim by his father. He and his brother moved to Pakistan with their father and stepmother after their parents were divorced in the 1990s. During his time there, Soofi attended the International School of Islamabad, where he was said by friends to have been popular among his classmates.

In 1998, after living in Pakistan for six years, Soofi moved back to the U.S. to live with his mother in Utah. The two later moved to Phoenix in the mid-2000s. According to his friends in Pakistan, he had difficulties adjusting to the American culture upon moving to the U.S. He took a pre-medical course at the University of Utah starting in the fall semester of 1998, but dropped out in the summer of 2003. At one point, he also owned Cleopatra Bistro Pizza, a pizza and hot wings eatery that served halal food, though the business struggled and eventually closed down five months prior to the attack.

Soofi was arrested and charged for more than twenty minor offenses, most of them traffic violations. In June 2001, when he was twenty, he pleaded guilty to possession of alcohol by a minor. In March 2002, he pleaded guilty to alcohol-related reckless driving, followed by another guilty plea in June 2002 for driving on a suspended license. In 2003, he was charged for distributing a controlled substance and possessing drug paraphernalia, although the case was later dismissed. That same year in July, Soofi pleaded guilty to a misdemeanor assault charge. The case was also dismissed.

He was survived by his parents and an eight-year-old son from a failed marriage. After the attack, his mother said her son was "brainwashed" by Simpson, claims that were echoed by his father and maternal grandmother, and that she did not blame police for killing her son.

=== Abdul Malik Abdul Kareem ===
Abdul Kareem was born and raised in Philadelphia as Decarus Lowell Thomas. In 2013, he changed his name to Abdul Malik Abdul Kareem and converted to Islam. He occasionally attended the Islamic Community Center of Phoenix since at least 2011 and cleaned carpets there. Kareem had a criminal record in Arizona, including two aggravated drunken driving convictions and an aggravated assault charge in 1997. In the latter incident, a woman told police that he pointed a gun in her direction; Abdul Kareem claimed he instead took the weapon away from his brother during an argument and wasn't pointing it at anyone. He had been arrested a total of eleven times between 1991 and 2004, and also served jail time twice.

Following the attack, he lied to FBI investigators several times and said he was not asked by Simpson or Soofi to directly participate in the attack. However, according to a confidential informant, Kareem was indeed planning on participating with them and had been angry at the informant for not selling him suppressors and bulletproof vests. He allegedly attempted to fund the attack by feigning injuries inflicted after being struck by a car and then making an insurance claim based on the injuries. Previously, Abdul Kareem was investigated by the FBI in 2012 for having a terrorism training document on his computer and developing a plot to attack the Super Bowl XLIX game in Glendale, Arizona with pipe bombs. He had also reportedly accessed a list released by ISIL, which contained the names and addresses of U.S. service members.

He was arrested on June 11 and charged with "conspiracy, making false statements and interstate transportation of firearms with intent to commit a felony." According to an indictment, Kareem practiced shooting with Simpson and Soofi between January and May in Phoenix. According to CNN, the firearms were all bought legally. His trial was initially set for August 4, but it was later rescheduled for October 6. On December 21, Abdul Kareem was also charged with conspiring to provide support to ISIL and attempting to attack the Super Bowl XLIX game. On March 17, 2016, Kareem was found guilty of conspiring with terrorists for helping the attack's perpetrators plan to carry it out. He was sentenced to 30 years in prison in February 2017. Kareem is serving his sentence at FCI Beaumont Medium, and is scheduled for release on November 20, 2041. On November 6, 2026, the United States Court of Appeals for the Ninth Circuit overturned Kareem's conviction on conspiracy to provide material support to a foreign terrorist organization, and remanded his case for resentencing.

== ISIL claim of responsibility ==
In addition to the gunman's tweet pledging allegiance to ISIL, the jihadist group claimed responsibility for the attack, stating on its Al Bayan radio station that "two soldiers of the Caliphate executed an attack on an art exhibit in Garland, Texas.... This exhibit was portraying negative pictures of the Prophet Mohammed." It marked the first time ISIL took credit for an attack in the mainland U.S. ISIL promised to launch further attacks in the future. There was initially no evidence that ISIL had contact with the perpetrators, and law enforcement groups continued to investigate a possible link. Some counterterrorism experts expressed doubts on the legitimacy of those claims, noting that ISIL has in the past claimed responsibility for attacks they actually had no involvement in. One U.S. official said the attack was "certainly more than just inspiration" by ISIL. A law enforcement official said the attack did "not appear to be a clear-cut case of a lone wolf, nor a pure case of someone directed by others to act"; instead, "it appears to be something in between the two extremes". According to Defense Secretary Ashton Carter, the shooting was inspired, but not directed, by ISIL.

In August 2015, Centcom announced that it had killed Junaid Hussain in a drone strike in Syria, due to his influence in motivating lone wolf-style attacks. U.S. officials reportedly had a strong desire to assassinate Hussain, listing him as the third-highest ISIL target on the Pentagon's "kill list" behind Abu Bakr al-Baghdadi and Mohammed Emwazi.

In December 2017, a Jewish-American internet troll, Joshua Ryne Goldberg, from Florida, was convicted of planning the bombing of a 2015 9/11 memorial event in Kansas City. In his communications with an FBI informant, Goldberg claimed credit for inspiring the Garland attack. Goldberg's fake Twitter persona using the name "Australi Witness" had posted a map of the Curtis Culwell Center and urged any in the area to attack "with your weapons, bombs, or knives". News reports about Goldberg's online persona calling for the Garland attack first brought Goldberg to the attention of the FBI. The FBI also found that Elton Simpson retweeted a message from Goldberg's Twitter handle on the morning of the attack.

== Aftermath ==
=== Reactions ===
The attack was condemned by public officials like Governor Greg Abbott and U.N. Secretary-General Ban Ki-moon. U.S. Secretary of Homeland Security Jeh Johnson condemned the attack and warned Americans not to blame the Muslim community. The Council on American–Islamic Relations and Nasim Rehmatullah of the Ahmadiyya Muslim Community condemned the event as hate speech but said that this did not justify the attack. In the wake of the attack, the Garland Independent School District announced it would begin reviewing its policy for hosting events at the Curtis Culwell Center.

Geller defended the contest as an expression of free speech and said that it was not intentionally provocative. She criticized the media for not defending the First Amendment, and pointed out that other religions have been similarly offended but do not react violently. Geller later told CNN that the shooting would not stop her and the AFDI from organizing similar events in the future. She also said that the shooting demonstrated why the event is needed. Commentators who defended the event include Eugene Volokh, Alan Dershowitz, Victor Davis Hanson, Bret Stephens, and Rich Lowry. Stephens said that criticism of the event was victim blaming, while Derschowitz likened Geller to Martin Luther King Jr. Texas Senator John Cornyn also defended the contest as an expression of free speech. Some right-wing commentators compared the attack to the Charlie Hebdo shooting, but Charlie Hebdo editor Gérard Biard rejected these comparisons, saying that Charlie Hebdo is "not obsessed about" Islam in its satire. Activist Jon Ritzheimer organized a protest for free speech during Friday prayers outside the Islamic Community Center of Phoenix where Simpson and Soofi had attended.

Commentators who criticized the event for being unnecessarily provocative or dangerous include Donald Trump, Bill O'Reilly, and Greta Van Susteren. Garland Mayor Douglas Athas said he wished Geller had not chosen his town for her event and explained, "Her actions put my police officers, my citizens and others at risk. Her program invited an incendiary reaction. She picked my community, which does not support in any shape, passion or form, her ideology. (...) But at the end of the day, we did our jobs, we protected her freedoms and her life".

ISIL supporters expressed their support for the attack online with postings on ISIL-affiliated websites. On June 2, 2015, Boston police killed a Roslindale man armed with a military-style knife after the man charged at the officers. The man had planned to assassinate Geller because of the contest, but became impatient and decided to target local police instead. Islamist Anjem Choudary endorsed death threats against Geller while he debated her on Hannity. Bosch Fawstin, the winner of the cartoon contest, has also received numerous death threats.

=== Legal issues ===
The Chicago Tribune reported on August 1 that Soofi, despite his long rap sheet, purchased a 9 mm gun in 2010 at Lone Wolf Trading Co., one of the private companies encouraged by the Bureau of Alcohol, Tobacco, Firearms and Explosives (ATF) to sell weapons to persons who normally would not be legally allowed such purchases, an action that would later become the ATF gunwalking scandal. The Tribune wrote that Soofi's purchase was initially put on a seven-day hold but that "for reasons that remain unclear, the hold was lifted after 24 hours, and Soofi got the 9-millimeter." The day after the attack, the U.S. Department of Justice sent an urgent firearms disposition request to Lone Wolf Trading Co. As of the date of the Tribune's report, the FBI has not released any details of the guns used by Simpson and Soofi.

The injured security guard, Bruce Joiner, filed a federal lawsuit in October 2017 against the FBI and DOJ. (Note: The case is Bruce Joiner v. United States of America and was filed in the Northern District of Texas, Dallas Division with case number 3:17-cv-02692-S.) Evidence submitted to court in previous cases confirm that an FBI undercover agent was in communication with the attackers and present at the Culwell Center during the attack. When he saw the attack underway he attempted to flee and was promptly stopped at gunpoint by Garland police. On December 21, 2018, US District Court Judge Karen Gren Scholer dismissed Joiner's lawsuit on grounds of sovereign immunity. (Note: Scholer's memorandum opinion and order, filed December 21, 2018, may be found at https://dockets.justia.com/docket/texas/txndce/3:2017cv02692/293751)

== See also ==
- 2015 Copenhagen shootings
- Charlie Hebdo shooting
- List of terrorist incidents in 2015
- Everybody Draw Mohammed Day
- Jyllands-Posten Muhammad cartoons controversy
- List of Islamist terrorist attacks
