= Kåre Bluitgen =

Danish writer and journalist

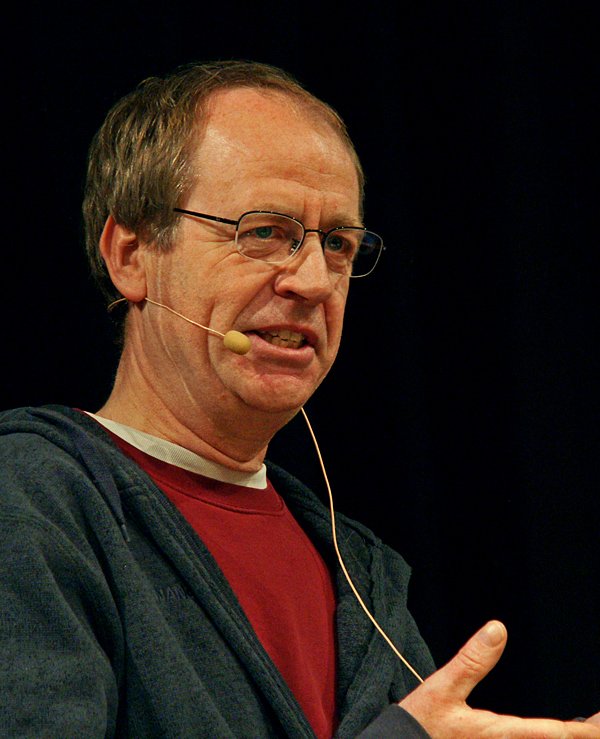
Kåre Bluitgen (2011)

Kåre Bluitgen (10 May 1959) is a Danish writer and journalist whose works include a biography of Muhammad. In the 1970s Bluitgen was politically active on the Danish left, namely within the Left Socialists.

== Education and career ==
Kåre Bluitgen received professional training in teaching and journalism, but has worked as a writer since 1994. His works includes a wide range of novels for both children, teenagers and adults. In addition, he has authored non-fiction, plays, films etc. Kåre Bluitgen has also worked as a translator, lecturer, publisher, and instructor in Folk High Schools in Denmark. Kåre Bluitgen has written both historical novels and fantasy, but often the themes of his books have been political, religious and philosophical.

He has received a number of the most distinguished Danish literary prizes for his internationally-focused works, and his books have been translated into numerous languages.

Bluitgen has travelled widely in connection with his books and films, visiting North Korea, Eritrea, South Africa, Mexico, Kurdistan, Kyrgyzstan, Burma, Haiti and Liberia, amongst other countries.

== Works ==
- Ernesto (1987)
- Bomuldens dronning (1988) ("Queen of the cotton")
- Jaguaren ved verdens ende (1989) ("The jaguar at the end of the world")
- Vi har iført os ligklæder (1989) ("We have put on grave clothing")
- Sabers udsendinge (1991) ("Saber's emissaries")
- Bødlens bud (1992) ("The commandment of the executioner")
- Lossen med guldører (1994) ("The lynx with golden ears")
- Erobrerne (1995) ("The conquerors")
- Og stjernene er af guld (1997) ("And the stars are made of gold")
- Himmelbrønden (1997) ("The heavenly well")
- En kuffert i Marokko (1999) ("A suitcase in Morocco")
- Løbende Bjørn (1999) ("Running bear")
- En støvle faldt fra himlen (2000) ("A boot fell from Heaven")
- Til gavn for de sorte (2002) ("To the benefit of the blacks")
- Døgnfluen Viva (2002) ("The May fly Viva")
- Koranen og profeten Muhammeds liv (2006)
- The Koran and the life of the Prophet Muhammad (2013) (E-book: ISBN 978-87-996000-5-2)
- Koranen kommenteret (2009) (The Qur'an commented]
- Koranen gendigtet (2009) (The Qur'an rewritten]
- De skyggefulde haver (2020) Illustrated Qur'an for teens, illustrated by Bosch Fawstin

=== Koranen og profeten Muhammeds liv image controversy ===
The cover of Koranen og profeten Muhammeds liv, depicting Muhammad astride Buraq

When he wrote the children's book Koranen og profeten Muhammeds liv ISBN 978-87-638-0049-5) (English: The Koran and the life of the Prophet Muhammad (ISBN 978-87-996000-5-2)), he apparently had difficulty finding illustrators to draw Muhammad for the book, for fear of reprisals from Islamic extremists. The Danish newspaper Jyllands-Posten responded by asking 40 illustrators to make caricatures of Muhammad. Twelve of the caricatures were published in the newspaper on 30 September 2005, sparking the international Muhammad cartoons controversy.

Bluitgen's book was peripheral to these events; there is no evidence that anything actually contained in Koranen og profeten Muhammeds liv was a direct cause of the ensuing controversy.
