= Astoria Center of Israel =

Synagogue in Queens, New York

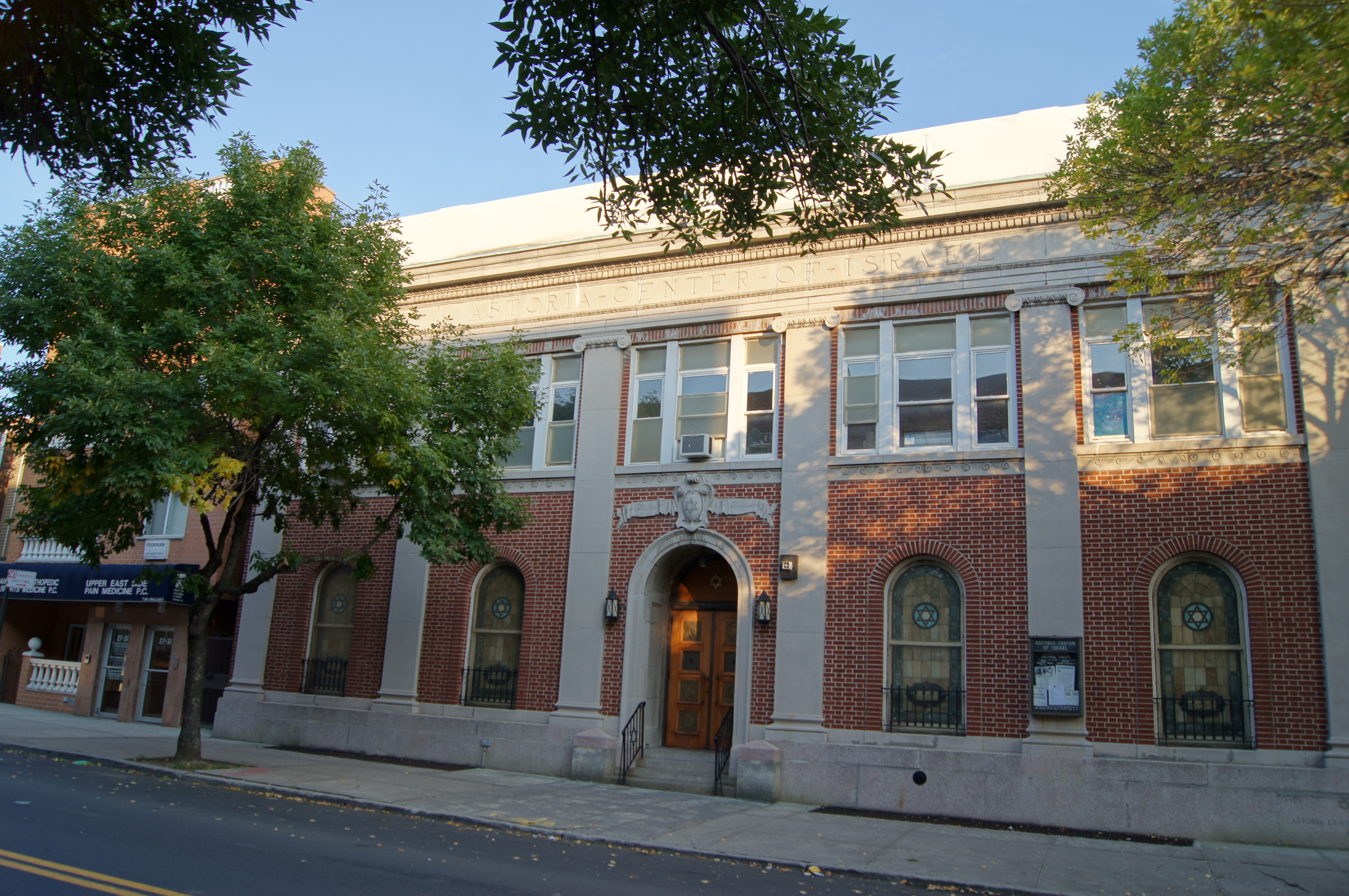

- Location in New York City

Religion
- Affiliation: Judaism
- Rite: Conservative
- Notable feature: Murals by Louis Pierre Rigal

Location
- Location: 27-35 Crescent Street, Astoria, Queens, New York City, New York
- Country: United States
- Coordinates: 40°46′12.79″N 73°55′25.58″W

Architecture
- Architect: Louis Allen Abramson
- Type: Synagogue
- Style: Classical Revival
- Established: c. 1880s (as a congregation)
- Completed: 1926

Website
- astoriacenter.org
- Astoria Center of Israel
- U.S. National Register of Historic Places
- Area: less than one acre
- NRHP reference No.: 09000833
- Added to NRHP: October 16, 2009

The Astoria Center of Israel is a Conservative Jewish synagogue located at 27-35 Crescent Street, Astoria, Queens, New York City, New York, United States.

The congregation's forbears date from the 1880s. Completed in 1926, the Classical Revival historic building was listed on the New York State Register of Historic Places and the National Register of Historic Places in October 2009.

== Design ==
The Astoria Center was designed by architect Louis Allen Abramson as one of the earliest synagogues in Queens. The building features a brick façade, two stories tall, and five bays wide. The trim is cast stone, and features double-height Ionic piers flanking round-arched windows. The piers support an entablature and are topped by a balustrade. Its round-arched entrance is topped with a cartouche, within which is inscribed a Star of David.

Among the synagogue's features is a set of murals by French artist Louis Pierre Rigal, added a few years after the building was completed.

== History ==
The roots of the Astoria Center of Israel can be traced back to Jewish congregation Mishkan Israel, begun sometime in the 1880s, constructing a building in 1906. In 1921 that congregation built a Talmud Torah next to its first building, where education could "implant in our children a love and reverence for our noble tradition." That education building later became the home of the Astoria Center of Israel, with the original Mishkan Israel building later destroyed in a fire.

In 1926, efforts were begun to enlarge the building that housed the new Astoria Center of Israel, and by 1929 ACI "had become a fully operational 'Center' of Jewish life in Queens." It was added to the National and State Registers of Historic Places in 2009.

== Rabbis ==
In 1926, Joshua L. Goldberg became the center's first rabbi. He had been drafted into the Russian Army during World War I, fled to the United States to enlist and serve with American forces in Europe, then returned to New York to attend rabbinical school and become a rabbi. With the outbreak of World War II, Goldberg returned to the U.S. military, this time as a chaplain, as the first rabbi to serve with the U.S. Navy in World War II. In 1951, he was named rabbi emeritus of ACI.
