= Home of the Daughters of Jacob =

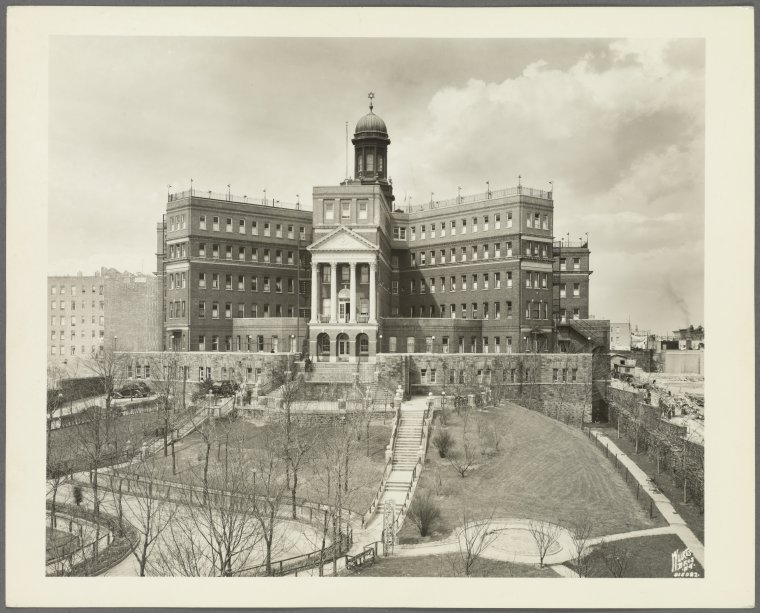

General information
- Type: Residential
- Location: 1201 Findlay Ave, Bronx, New York
- Coordinates: 40°49′56″N 73°54′44″W
- Year built: 1916

Technical details
- Floor count: 5

Design and construction
- Architect: Louis Abramson

The Home of the Daughters of Jacob is a building on 167th Street in the Morrisania neighborhood of the Bronx in New York City. Designed in 1916 by Louis Abramson as a residence for elderly Orthodox Jews, the building is wheel-shaped, with eight wings arranged radially around a central core.

The central core contained administrative offices and was topped by a tower, which at the time of its construction was the highest point in the Bronx. The eight wings were residences for more than 1,000 elderly men and women, replacing the existing home run by the Daughters of Jacob at 301 East Broadway in Manhattan, which could only house 200 people.

The plans for the new building included a synagogue with seating for 1,000 people, a 600-seat dining room, as well as a hospital, library, and a Turkish bath, with construction costs for the four-story building estimated to be $300,000, equivalent to $6.1 million in 2025. A fifth story added to the building in 1938 provided additional hospital space for operating rooms along with X-ray, cardiological, physiotherapy, and dental facilities at a cost of $180,000, equivalent to $3.2 million in 2025.

By 1973, the building was deemed no longer fit for its original purpose, owing to new health codes. Abramson, then 84 years old, was part of the design team which modernized the building, connecting it by pedestrian bridges to new buildings on the opposite sides of Findlay and Teller Avenues. Abramson told the New York Times that the philosophy of how to house the elderly had changed over the years; previously it was felt that providing meals and a bed in a ward was acceptable, but modern practice was to offer greater privacy, individual dignity, and opportunities to remain active.
