= Joshua L. Goldberg =

Belarusian-born American rabbi and U.S. Navy chaplain (1896–1994)

Joshua Louis Goldberg
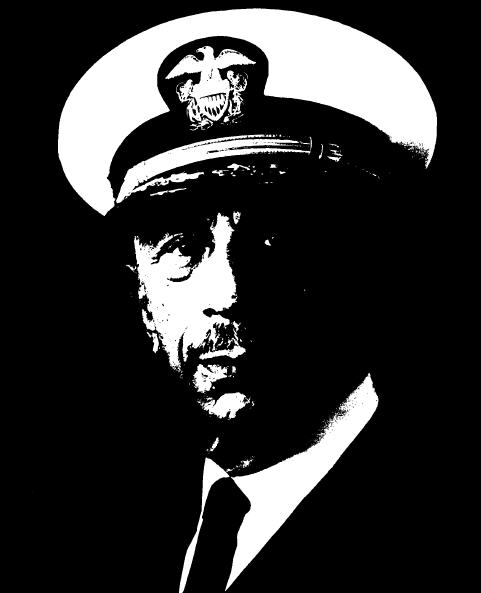
- Portrait of Goldberg
- Born: January 6, 1896; Belarus, Russian Empire (Present-day, Belarus)
- Died: December 24, 1994 (aged 98); West Palm Beach, Florida, U.S.
- Burial place: Arlington National Cemetery, Arlington County, Virginia, U.S.
- Military career
- Allegiance: United States of America
- Branch: Russian Imperial Army; United States Army; United States Navy
- Service years: 1914–1916 (Russia); 1917–1920 (U.S. Army); 1942–1960 (U.S. Navy)
- Rank: Private (Russia); Sergeant (U.S. Army); Captain (U.S. Navy)
- Conflicts: World War I World War II
- Awards: 5 WWI battle ribbons; Legion of Merit
- Other work: Rabbi; Columnist

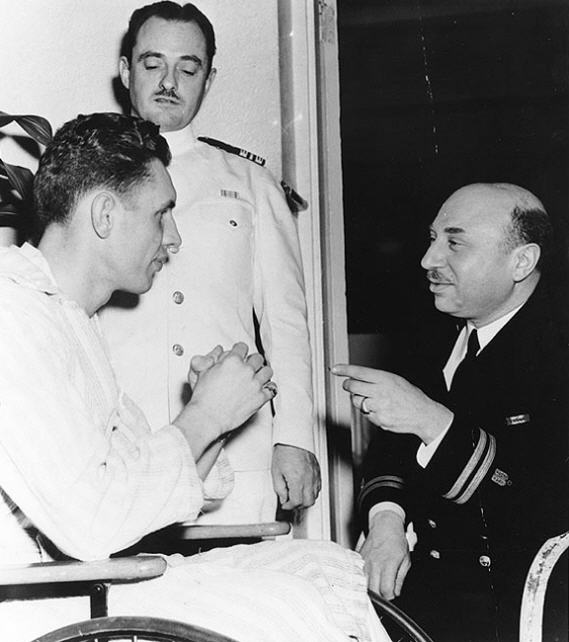
Then Lieutenant Joshua Goldberg visits wounded Pharmacist's Mate Edward Bykowski, whose legs were broken when the USS Vincennes was sunk in 1942 during the Battle of Savo Island. Photo: February 10, 1943.

Joshua Louis Goldberg (January 6, 1896 – December 24, 1994) was a Belarusian-born American rabbi, the first to be commissioned as a U.S. Navy chaplain in World War II (and only the third to serve in the Navy in its history), the first to reach the rank of Navy Captain (the equivalent of Army Colonel), and the first to retire after a full active-duty career.

He had a highly unusual military background for a U.S. Navy chaplain, having been drafted into the Russian army when he was a teenager, then deserting to make his way to the United States where he enlisted in the U.S. Army, serving in an infantry unit in Europe during World War I before beginning rabbinical school studies in New York City after the war.

On January 16, 2025, Secretary of the Navy Carlos Del Toro announced that a future Navy ship would be named the USNS Joshua L. Goldberg (T-AO 215), the first ship to be named after a Jewish chaplain.

== Life and works ==
=== Early life ===
Goldberg was born on January 6, 1896, in Belarus (then part of the Russian Empire), the son of a lumber merchant in Babruysk, and educated in Odessa, Ukraine and Tel Aviv (then part of Palestine).

He was drafted into the Imperial Russian Army when he was 18, serving as a private until deserting his unit to flee Russia after the collapse of the Russian western front. He was able to reach the United States in 1916, after an eight-month journey by way of Siberia, Manchuria, Korea, and Japan.

He arrived in Seattle and traveled to New York, where he returned to the military, enlisting to serve with artillery units in the American Expeditionary Forces in France during World War I. He served in the army 1917–1920, leaving as a sergeant.

Goldberg recounted that when the army recruiter who enlisted him discovered that he spoke almost no English, he should "keep his mouth shut." Goldberg followed the recruiter's advice, secretly spending "many an hour at night in the latrine at Fort Slocum, hiding with my [Russian-English] dictionary, trying to maintain my goal of mastering 50 new words every day." Once in France, Goldberg's fluency in French was often put to use through service as an interpreter. In addition to English and French, Goldberg spoke four other languages: Yiddish, German, Hebrew, and Russian.

After the war, he returned to America to teach Hebrew, then began rabbinical studies at the Jewish Institute of Religion in Manhattan, and was ordained in 1926, accepting the position of rabbi at New York's Astoria Center of Israel in 1926. While serving at the Astoria Center, he made weekly visits to the Brooklyn Naval Hospital to visit service personnel, and later—at the suggestion of one of the doctors at that hospital—he volunteered for service as a Navy chaplain with the outbreak of World War II.

=== Later achievements ===
Goldberg served as president of the Alumni Association for the Jewish Institute of Religion during the 1930s. He was active in many other organizations and held numerous leadership positions during his career, including: Chaplain of the Department of Hospitals of New York City; Board of Trustees, Queens Public Library; Executive Council, Queens Council of the Boy Scouts of America; Vice President, Queens College Association; Board of Trustees, Jewish Institute of Religion; Board of Governors, Queens Committee for Jewish Social Service; National Secretary, American Jewish Congress; Executive member, Committee of Jewish Delegation in Paris, France; Vice-President, Queens Welfare Committee; and Vice-President, Queens Family Welfare Society. Along with Supreme Court Justice Charles S. Colden, Goldberg "was instrumental in the establishment of Queens College."

Goldberg lectured extensively throughout the United States and authored many articles on Jewish and American life. In 1950, he was named rabbi emeritus of the Astoria Jewish Center.

In 1952, during a visit to Spain, Goldberg (wearing his U.S. Navy uniform) became the first rabbi in 461 years to preach during Jewish services in Madrid, in an "improvised" synagogue. When the small community expressed its desire for a permanent rabbi, Goldberg's involvement became a factor in the hiring of Rabbi David A. Jessurun Cordozo in 1953.

In 1961, Goldberg and his wife Henrietta returned from a visit to the Soviet Union to begin writing and speaking on the plight of Soviet Jews, including an article written by Goldberg that was published in Look Magazine, where he wrote that antisemitism was more of a threat to Jews under communism than it had been under the Czars: "Being a Jew under the Czars was only a disability—not a calamity. Within these restrictions, the Jews developed a rich intellectual, cultural, and most importantly, religious life".

Now, however, he continues,

The Jews are afraid to go to the synagogues lest their children lose their jobs; afraid to complain, lest they be accused of being counter-revolutionaries; afraid to ask for a visa to join families in Israel lest they be accused of participating in Zionist-capitalistic conspiracies; afraid to communicate with relatives in the United States lest they be dubbed potential spies. They have become a community of whisperers in a kingdom of fear.

In 1962, Goldberg served as tour leader for International Conference of Jewish War Veterans in Israel, leading a New York delegation on a tour of sites in London, Paris, Rome, and Israel.

=== United States Navy ===
Upon his commissioning as a U.S. Navy officer on January 8, 1942, Goldberg became the first rabbi accepted as a Navy chaplain in World War II and eventually was promoted to the rank of Navy captain. He was the first rabbi (Jewish chaplain) to earn this rank, an honor that was especially significant because at that time there were only 18 Navy chaplains holding the rank of captain. During the war, the Navy sent him to Navy bases around the world as part of a Jewish-Catholic-Protestant chaplain team. "By conducting interfaith services, he made sure American soldiers and sailors had places to worship regardless of their faith." The trip—March 8, 1944 – May 20, 1944—covered more than 28,000 miles, including visits to naval installations in the Caribbean, South America, North Africa, and the United Kingdom, and was led by then U.S. Navy Chief of Chaplains Robert Workman. Following the trip, Goldberg spoke to stateside groups on the importance of "greater sacrifice" on the part of civilians back home.

In 1944, Goldberg helped develop a "practical field training manual" for theological students being trained to serve as chaplains, and in 1945 the Navy published his 40-page manual, "Ministering to Jews in the Navy," a volume that helped non-Jewish chaplains support the needs of Jewish personnel. After the establishment of the State of Israel, Goldberg was sent on a visit as a "special representative of the Chief of Naval Operations—"concerning matters of a delicate nature and with important implications in the area of international understanding."

Because the Navy had no Jewish chaplain officially attached to the staff of the Chief of Chaplains, Goldberg—as the senior Jewish chaplain in the Navy—served in an unofficial capacity as the Jewish representative to that staff.

After the conclusion of World War II, Goldberg continued to work with chaplains of other faiths, including participation in two NATO conferences on "building ecumenism among the military clergy." In 1960, he became the first Jewish chaplain to receive the Legion of Merit. He had received five battle ribbons for his earlier service with the infantry.

In 1949, Goldberg was assigned as chaplain to the Third Naval District—the first Jewish chaplain to serve as chaplain for a Navy district—responsible for the coordination of all Navy chaplains in New York, Connecticut, and a portion of New Jersey. His naval career had begun as a member of the staff of the Third Naval District Chaplain January 1942 – July 1949, before serving as the District Chaplain July 1949 – January 1960.

Former Navy Chief of Chaplains Ross Trower wrote that Goldberg was "chiefly responsible" for the influential radio program, "The Navy Goes to Church," which "conveyed to millions of people the concern of the Navy for the spiritual welfare of its personnel."

From 1950 to 1954 he served as Special Consultant to the Department of Defense Armed Forces Chaplains Board.

Looking back at his Naval career, Goldberg reflected that:

My life in the Navy has been a saga of deep spiritual satisfaction. The Navy Chaplain Corps motto was "cooperation without compromise", and that's what it was like. Rabbis, Priests, and Ministers went out together, worked together, and spoke on the same platform. Priests and Protestant Ministers helped arrange Passover services throughout the world. It was not a lessening of stature for us to help each other. We lifted each other up, and helped preserve the dignity of each other's religion. We were practicing "ecumenism" long before anyone had heard of the word.

=== Retirement and death ===
As Goldberg's retirement approached, one newspaper article included the following words:

If any man served his country beyond the call of duty, if any man served in a position all the hours of every day, knowing no time off and no private life, that man is Chaplain Joshua Goldberg, who once was called the Religious Diplomat of our time. And this can be said of him that every admiral who ever served over Chaplain Goldberg, that every man who was his Boss, is turning out to honor him on his retirement. It is a rare quality that wins for a sky-pilot the friendship and respect of hard-boiled Navy Admirals. "Josh" deserves the love he has gained.

Following his January 1, 1960 retirement from the Navy, Goldberg continued to support military personnel in many ways, including his decision to pay his own expenses in order to travel to Naples for a number of years in a row to lead services for the Jewish High Holy Days for overseas Jewish military personnel. Upon his Naval retirement, Goldberg was appointed assistant to President Nelson Glueck at Hebrew Union College - Jewish Institute of Religion.

Goldberg retired to West Palm Beach, where he wrote the weekly column "Wisdom of the heart," in the Palm Beach Post.

On December 24, 1994, Goldberg died in West Palm Beach, Florida and was buried on January 6, 1995, in Arlington National Cemetery. He was 98.

== Education ==
Goldberg's formal education included:

- Herzliya College, Palestine, 1914
- University of Odessa, Russia, B.A., 1916
- Jewish Institute of Religion, New York City, New York, M.H.L. and rabbinic ordination, 1926
- Hebrew Union College-Jewish Institute of Religion, New York City, New York, D.D. (Honorary), 1951

== Family ==
Goldberg married writer and former R.H. Donnelley executive Henrietta C. Davis on August 22, 1948. Goldberg had two daughters from a previous marriage to Eleanor Rottman - Josephine and Naomi. At the time of Goldberg's death, he and Henrietta had four grandchildren and two great-grandchildren.

Much of Goldberg's family, including his mother and younger sister, died during World War II in the gas chambers of Auschwitz.

He was also a champion level ice skater and trained the Wiener family whilst on vacation in Phoenicia, New York.

== Awards and memorials ==
Goldberg received the Frank Weil Award for "distinguished contributions to the Armed Services" in 1958.

That same year, Goldberg received the Gold Medal of Merit from the Jewish War Veterans of the United States. General Omar Bradley made the award presentation, with remarks by former Secretary of the Navy Charles Thomas and Roman Catholic Cardinal Francis Spellman.

Among his many other awards was the Four Chaplains Award presented by the Alexander D. Goode lodge of B'nai B'rith in 1956. He also received a special "Medal for International Cooperation" from the French government, assigning him the honorary rank of commander in the French military. In 1959, the New York Police Department Shomrim Society honored Goldberg with its first annual "Person of the Year" award.

On February 10, 1995, the Captain Joshua L. Goldberg Memorial Chapel was dedicated in his honor at the National Museum of American Jewish Military History in Washington, D.C.
