= Marie-Therese Mackowsky =

German mineralogist (1913–1986)

Marie-Therese Mackowsky (1913-1986) was a German mineralogist.

== Early life ==
Marie-Therese Mackowsky was born on December 7, 1913, in Koblenz, Germany. She grew up within the generation that witnessed both World Wars which affected her university studies. As a result of her deep dedication to her career, research, and students, she remained unmarried.

== Biography and education ==
In 1933, Mackowsky studied science at the University of Freiburg, University of Konigsberg, and University of Bonn. She specialized in mineralogy and graduated from the University of Bonn in 1938 as a doctor of natural science. Mackowsky would work on many of the physico-chemical and mineralogical subjects inherent with precious stones during her time as an assistant to the chair of mineralogy at the University of Bonn. After earning her doctorate in 1938 with a dissertation on the relationship between the optical and chemical properties of garnet, she would begin working at the Syndicate for Mining Interests (Verein für die bergbaulichen Interessen) on January 1, 1940.

She completed her inaugural dissertation in 1944 at the then Clausthal School of Mining (Bergakademie Clausthal). In 1951, she received the venia legendi from the University of Münster, and became Visiting Professor in 1957. She lectured in technical mineralogy and coal petrology up until her last days.

In an article from The International Journal of Coal Geology, Mackowsky is mentioned in the Postscripts and describes her as a passionate woman. This passion came hand in hand with her fiery personality. It was also mentioned that she was very much filled with enthusiasm, and was, and still is, respected by many.

== Career ==
Mackowsky was fluent in both English and French. She also spoke and translated to Russian and German. Marie gave assistance in the care and instruction of many foreign visitors to Essen. She also became a founding member of the ICCP. At international congresses, she translated one language into the other, particularly at meetings of the International Committee for Coal Petrology (ICCP). She was not able to pursue her professional preference, the mineralogy of precious stones but took up work at the test laboratory for coal properties with Verein fir die Bergaulichen. During her employment, Mackowsky would have a profound influence on the Research Department for Raw Materials, helping it develop into the world renowned Coal Petrology Laboratory of the Bergbau-Forschung GmbH.

Coming up with solutions to problems in practical application were always a challenge to Mackowsky. She performed microscopic measuring techniques to solve problems regarding the mining, utilization, and preparation methods of hard coal. These were methods of chemical analysis but they would only yield average, but inaccurate values. She moved from crystallogy and theoretical mineralogy to a more hands-on mineralogy which then lead to a move from the study of garnets to coal. From this field of study, she has produced 107 publications with contributions in textbooks, handbooks and encyclopedias. Her work would be officially recognized on January 1, 1965, when she was promoted to the Director of the Section for Mineralogy and Petrology in the Bergbau-Forschung GmbH.

Outside of mineralogy, Mackowsky would become a member of the Soroptimists in 1962 advocating for the professionalism of women, eventually becoming the President of the German Union of Soroptimist International from 1972 to 1974. She was also an International Journal of Coal Geology editorial member.

In 1979, she was awarded with the GEORG-AGRICOLA-Medal, bestowed by the German Mineralogical Society (Deutsche Mineralogische Gesellschaft) in recognition of her outstanding achievements in applied mineralogy.

She would become actively involved in the Kohlenpetrographische Arbeitsgemeinschaft, a working group for German petrologists as well as the Commission for Technical Mineralogy of the German Mineralogical Society from 1972 to 1977.

When Mackowsky became a professor, she helped her students prepare for their future careers and gave lectures specifically about coal petrography mineralogy at the University in Munster.

Eva Marie Wolff-Fischer made a compilation of all of Marie Therese Mackowsky’s publications, titled, “Publications of Marie-Therese Mackowsky.”

Marie-Therese Mackowsky’s made her scientific work on the investigations on mineralogy and petrography accessible to colleagues and scientists. Because of her initiative, the Essen laboratories, which later became the Department of Mineralogy and Petrography in Bergbau-Forschung, became a training center for scientists in coal petrography globally.

Marie-Therese Mackowsky’s work is well known and her research institute of Steinkohlen-bergbauverein became a leading authority mineralogy. Her work is also important coal conversion business.

Mackowsky's work remains relevant with her research on the classification of macerals and microlithotypes which laid the foundations of the International Manual of Coal Petrography.

== Coal Geology ==
Marie Therese Mackowsky was a big influence to Bergbau-Forschung Coal Petrography Laboratory and its development of industrial application of coal petrology. She, together with W. Simonis In 1969, published an article discussing the use of mackerel analysis and coal types to predict coke strength, in the identification of coke. This method still continues to be used to this day. Mackowsky made discoveries regarding the relationship between coke homogeneity and coke ovens. She studied the development of preventative methods to combat coke oven damage. Through her research, she was able to explain the changes in coke quality which resulted from these pyrolytic deposits. Marie’s phenomenal efforts are the reason why any coals used for chemical examinations are completely characterized from the petrographic and the mineralogic aspect. In 1979, the Chemistry and Mineralogy/Petrology sections unified to make research more effective and efficient. Marie began in Garnets but moved to the more applied research of coal mineralogy. Furthermore, Mackowsky (alongside Echteroff) analyzed the transition of coal to coke (under specific experimental circumstances) in 1960, which was the first completed investigation conducted of its kind. Together, they found that the plastic zone was where coke was created and were able to successfully transform coal into coke. Mackowsky also conducted many experiments and activities such as combustion, hydrogenation, and carbonization with other researchers to investigate coke and discover how to achieve the best quality of it. Accompanied by her colleagues, Marie worked at GmbH developing methods of coal analysis, which included its use in the coal mining industry. Through the work of Mackowsky, petrography became a mainstream method for coal analysis. Marie is also well known for taking an unconventional stance on methods for characterizing coal, as she sided with the method of Microlithotypes over the opposing method of Macirals. Mackowsky had a goal of making a valid characterization of coals and their mineral contents, specifically cokes and graphite's, to become universal.

== Other ideologies and developments ==
Mackowsky published an article, together with Eva-Marie Wolff, titled “Microscopic Investigations of Pore Formation during Coking.”

== Publications ==
The topics of Mackowsky's publications evolved as her areas of interest and research fluctuated. In 1942 her publications generally revolved around the topic of mineralogy, and in 1943 coals and cokes where the topics which she mainly focused on. Furthermore, in 1952 she published a vital article alongside peer Ambramski regarding coke microscopy. Her vast publications contributed to the improvement of coal measurement techniques and as well as the characterization and classification of coal. In 1983 she released her final publication, "The Application of Coal Petrography".

== Retirement ==
In 1978 she would retire, having spent her entire career at the Syndicate. Despite her retirement on December 31, 1978, she chose to remain active in her profession as a volunteer in Essen. Furthermore, she helped PhD students with their research and theses, who benefited from her years of experience in the field.

== Death ==
After being diagnosed with a short severe illness, Mackowsky moved to Bad Mergentheim, Germany in hopes of overcoming her illness. She died on August 4, 1986, at the age of 73 (Bad Mergentheim, Germany). A symposium was held in 2003 to honour and show appreciation for Marie Mackowsky and her contributions to the development and study of Coal Sciences and Applied Petrology, during the 55th meeting of the ICCP.

== Honours and awards ==
- Chair of Commission III, International Committee for Coal and Organic Petrology (ICCP), (1971-1975)
- President, International Committee for Coal and Organic Petrology (ICCP), (1976-1979)
- President, German Union of Soroptimist International
- Fellow, Institute of Fuel
- Reinhardt-Theissen Medal, International Committee for Coal Petrology, (1971)
- Carl-Engler Medal, German Society for Mineral Oil Science, (1978)
- Georg Agricola Medal, German Mineralogical Society, (1979)
