= Joshua Ryne Goldberg =

Jewish-American Internet troll

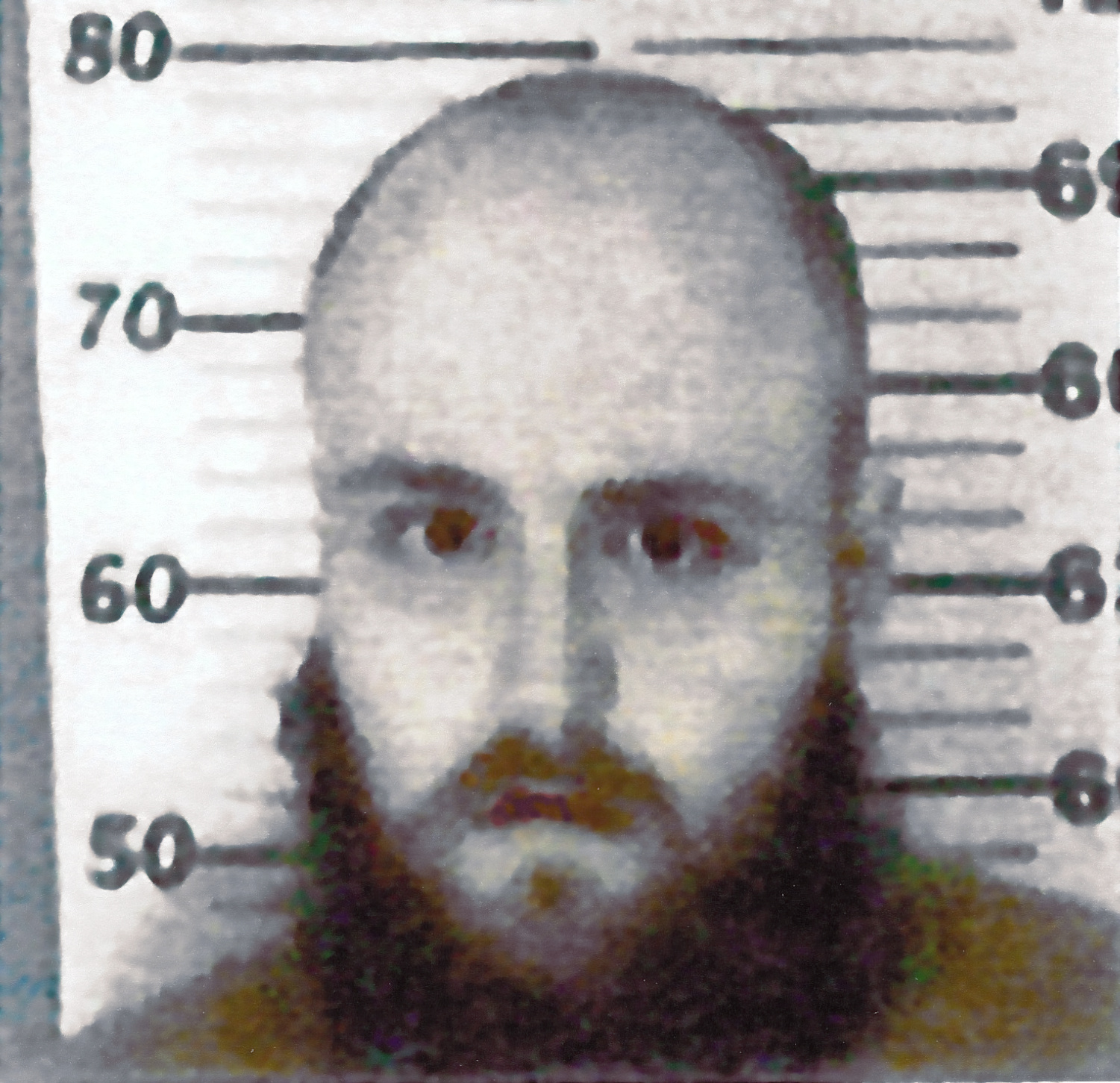
- Goldberg in 2023
- Born: May 14, 1995 (age 31); Jacksonville, Florida, United States
- Other names: Australi Witness, Tanya Cohen, Madotsuki the Dreamer, MoonMetropolis, European88, Michael Slay, AustWitness, AusWitness
- Status: Released
- Conviction: Attempted malicious damage and destruction of a building using an explosive (18 U.S.C. § 844)
- Penalty: 10 years imprisonment plus lifetime of supervised release

Details
- Date apprehended: September 9, 2015

Joshua Ryne Goldberg (born May 14, 1995) is a Jewish-American internet troll convicted of attempting a bombing on the 14th anniversary of the September 11 attacks while posing as an Islamic terrorist affiliated with ISIS.

Goldberg first received law-enforcement and media attention under his Twitter handle "Australi Witness" following the Curtis Culwell Center attack, a terrorist attack on a Garland, Texas exhibit featuring images of Muhammad in May 2015, in which two assailants died in a shootout with police. The "Australi Witness" persona had, posing as a Perth jihadist, called for an attack on, and posted maps of, the center where the exhibit was taking place. "Australi Witness" was retweeted by one of the assailants before the attack, and praised the jihadist attackers in its aftermath. Goldberg claimed credit for the attack; he also allegedly planned terrorist attacks in Australia.

Goldberg had many online identities and spent "huge amounts" of time on the internet. In addition to his accounts that purported to be Islamic terrorism supporters, he made thousands of troll posts under different aliases advocating for liberal feminism, neo-Nazism, and other ideologies. In a 2019 self-published article on Medium, Goldberg admitted to having operated at least 27 different accounts on Reddit alone and many more on other websites, with false online identities on all sides of the ideological spectrum.

Initially charged with distributing information about bomb-making techniques in connection with a planned attack on a 2015 Kansas City 9/11 memorial event, Goldberg's trial was suspended pending efforts by doctors to return him to competence after it emerged that he had a history of mental illness. Goldberg was returned to competency and on December 20, 2017, pleaded guilty to federal charges of attempted malicious damage and destruction by an explosive of a building. On June 25, 2018, Goldberg was sentenced to ten years in federal prison and lifetime supervision.

== Early life ==
Goldberg is Jewish. He lived with his parents in Orange Park, Florida, a suburb of Jacksonville.

== Online activities ==
Goldberg made online posts under many pseudonyms and spent 14 to 20 hours on the internet per day. After learning of his internet activities, the FBI attempted to place him under physical surveillance, but this was generally ineffective because for several weeks he did not leave his parents' house or open the front door.

=== Islamist-related personas ===
==== Australi Witness ====
Australi Witness was an online persona claiming to be an ISIS-affiliated jihadist from Australia, who was described by Rita Katz, executive director of SITE Intelligence Group, as holding a "prestigious position" in online jihadi circles.

Australi Witness retweeted a call for an attack on the Draw Muhammad Contest being held at the Curtis Culwell Center in Garland, Texas, on May 3, 2015. The post that Australi Witness retweeted called on "brothers in Texas" to go there "with your weapons, bombs or with knifes [sic]" to "defend your Prophet". The Australi Witness persona also posted maps to the event. Subsequently, two men, identified as Phoenix, Arizona, residents Elton Simpson and Nadir Soofi, were shot dead by police as they attempted to attack the contest. The FBI found that Simpson retweeted a message from the Australi Witness Twitter handle on the morning of the attack. Australi Witness claimed credit for having inspired the attack to multiple media outlets, praised Simpson and Soofi as martyrs, and expressed support for the attack in an interview with Fairfax Media.

Australi Witness posted a 50-page guide online on how to join the terror group ISIS, and later posted a list of synagogues in Australia, ostensibly to encourage his supporters to attack them. He communicated that he was planning an attack in Melbourne to an FBI informant, who posed as a jihadist, and a 17-year-old who pleaded guilty to planning a Mother's Day 2015 bombing in Melbourne using pressure cooker and pipe bombs, which was never carried out, was found to have been in contact with Goldberg.

According to the FBI, Australi Witness posted to an ISIS-related website that he had recruited two people (one in Los Angeles, the other in Melbourne) to, "using guns, shoot up local synagogues when the maximum amount of Jews are praying", stating that "the entire thing was my idea, and I helped them every step of the way".

Australi Witness also claimed to have worked for Amnesty International, asked followers to target Australian cartoonist Larry Pickering, and repeatedly attempted to associate himself with anti-Islamophobia campaigner Mariam Veiszadeh.

==== Junaid Thorne and fake jihadist personas ====
Goldberg reportedly set up a fake account in the name of Australian Muslim preacher Junaid Thorne. Goldberg also created multiple fake jihadist accounts, which interacted with the fake Thorne account, and he then sent screengrabs of the fabricated interactions to journalists, at least one of whom published the fake interaction in an article of The West Australian in April 2015.

The fake jihadist personas were also used to besmirch Amnesty International and the Human Rights Law Centre by claiming that the fake jihadists had employment ties, or donated money to, these organizations. This persona was linked to Goldberg on Facebook.

=== Feminism-related personas ===
==== Caitlin Roper ====
Goldberg reportedly set up a fake Twitter account in the name of anti-sexual exploitation campaigner Caitlin Roper, who allegedly earned his ire because of her efforts to get the video game Grand Theft Auto V banned in Australia. The fake account sent Promoted Tweets that targeted the transgender community.

==== Tanya Cohen ====
Under this persona, Goldberg posed as a female left-wing Australian activist opposed to free speech. Goldberg's work under the persona was published in many places, including Thought Catalog, a Daily Kos diary; and Feministing, a feminist blog. Wall Street Journal columnist James Taranto apologized for believing a hoax allegedly perpetrated by Goldberg under the name "Tanya Cohen" earlier in 2015.

National Review's Charles Cooke described the article that Taranto responded to as "exquisite satire", while Mike Masnick of Techdirt called it "damn good satire, because it's just stupid enough at the beginning to drag you in and make you believe it, and then, slowly but surely, over the course of a very long writeup, it starts tossing out ever more ridiculous ideas -- drip... drip... drip -- that just, gently, turn up the outrage-o-meter, such that many people don't even realize that it's satire." This persona was linked to Goldberg on Facebook.

=== White supremacist personas ===
Many subreddits he created or moderated, including "r/CoonTown", were banned during a period when Reddit's content policy was revised in August 2015.

Goldberg posted on the neo-Nazi website The Daily Stormer as "Michael Slay". Upon his arrest and unveiling, the administrator of the site removed his posts.

=== Other personas ===
==== Times of Israel blog hoax ====
In April 2015, Goldberg covertly wrote and posted a hoax article on a Times of Israel blog calling for the extermination of the Palestinian people. The article was ostensibly written by Josh Bornstein, a Jewish Australian lawyer, and triggered widespread condemnation. Bornstein immediately disavowed responsibility for the post, which was deleted by The Times of Israel. It has since been shown and accepted that Bornstein was the victim of the malicious hoax by Goldberg.

Initially, it was believed that the hoax was perpetrated by white supremacists. In May 2015, Bornstein faced online threats from Goldberg's Australi Witness Twitter account, and it was only later learned that Goldberg was responsible for the hoaxing.

=== Emily Goldstein ===
In 2015, he wrote an article titled 'Yes, Diversity is About Getting Rid of White People (and That's a Good Thing)' attributing it to a fake author named "Emily Goldstein". The article was later retweeted by Elon Musk.

=== MoonMetropolis ===
Goldberg was also active on Twitter, Reddit, Disqus and others under the username MoonMetropolis, a "free speech absolutist" who was involved with the Gamergate controversy. He would frequently use this persona to criticize the works of his other personas such as activist Tanya Cohen, arguing against points that he himself had made.

Goldberg also posted strong opinions on the subject of free speech absolutism to the website Thought Catalog, using both the MoonMetropolis name and his own name.

On April 28, 2024, 27 days after his prison release, Goldberg announced on his X account an "ask me anything" (AMA) session on the imageboard soyjak.party, as he was unable to make one on Reddit due to having been banned from the site.

== Unmasking and criminal proceedings ==
News reports about the Australi Witness online persona calling for the Garland attack first brought the account to the attention of the Federal Bureau of Investigation (FBI). The Australian Federal Police (AFP) alerted the FBI about the real identity of Australi Witness, with the AFP, in turn, being handed the information by two Australian journalists, Elise Potaka and Luke McMahon. However, according to the FBI affidavit filed in court, by the time they received this information from the AFP, their investigation into Goldberg was already well underway. Potaka and McMahon independently tracked and identified the person behind the Australi Witness account after he impersonated Potaka on Facebook, leading to a chain of events which connected Australi Witness to Goldberg. The FBI also directly linked Australi Witness to Goldberg via his IP address.

Australi Witness passed specific information on the manufacture of a bomb targeting a September 11 memorial event in Kansas City, Missouri, to an FBI informant, who was posing as a Muslim extremist. According to the FBI, Australi Witness suggested that the informant bomb the memorial in Kansas City after the latter claimed to live near that city, and also encouraged the informant to make the bomb more deadly by adding rat poison to the shrapnel. Australi Witness posted pictures online of what he claimed was a bomb he was building, and emailed BBC journalist Mike Wendling, claiming credit for the Curtis Culwell Center attack and warning that a pressure cooker bomb would be detonated in a "large Midwestern US city" on September 11, 2015.

Goldberg was arrested by the FBI after being identified as Australi Witness on September 9, 2015. After a raid on his home by the FBI, Goldberg allegedly admitted to agents that he had distributed the information about making the bomb in Kansas City. Goldberg appeared in court on September 15, where he was ordered to undergo a 30-day mental health evaluation to determine his fitness to stand trial.

After his arrest, it emerged that Goldberg had previously been diagnosed with schizophrenia and anxiety disorder. On December 14, 2015, after an examination by prison psychologist Lisa Feldman at Federal Detention Center, Miami, US Magistrate Judge James Klindt ruled Goldberg mentally incompetent to stand trial and Goldberg was ordered to undergo psychiatric treatment for four months at the Federal Medical Center, Butner. Goldberg again appeared before Klindt on June 15, 2016, and was described by prison psychiatrists as "improving", and that there was a "good chance" of him being returned to competency to stand trial. Another status update was scheduled by Klindt for October 15, 2016. Goldberg's lawyer, Paul Shorstein, later said that Goldberg had Asperger syndrome and had been diagnosed with clinical depression. Goldberg's defense subsequently claimed that Goldberg had autism, wanted to be a journalist, and had made "impressive" journalistic progress in his trolling activities. Goldberg has claimed that he was the target of abuse by prison staff because of his autism.

On December 20, 2017, Goldberg pleaded guilty to attempted malicious damage and destruction by an explosive of a building, in the United States District Court for the Middle District of Florida. The plea agreement also claimed that Goldberg had been planning a terrorist attack in Melbourne, Australia.

On June 25, 2018, Goldberg was sentenced to ten years at the Federal Correctional Complex, Butner in Butner, North Carolina, followed by lifetime supervised release.

Goldberg was released from prison on April 1, 2024.

== See also ==
- Internet manipulation
- Sockpuppet
