= Islamic Community Center of Phoenix =

Mosque in Phoenix, Arizona

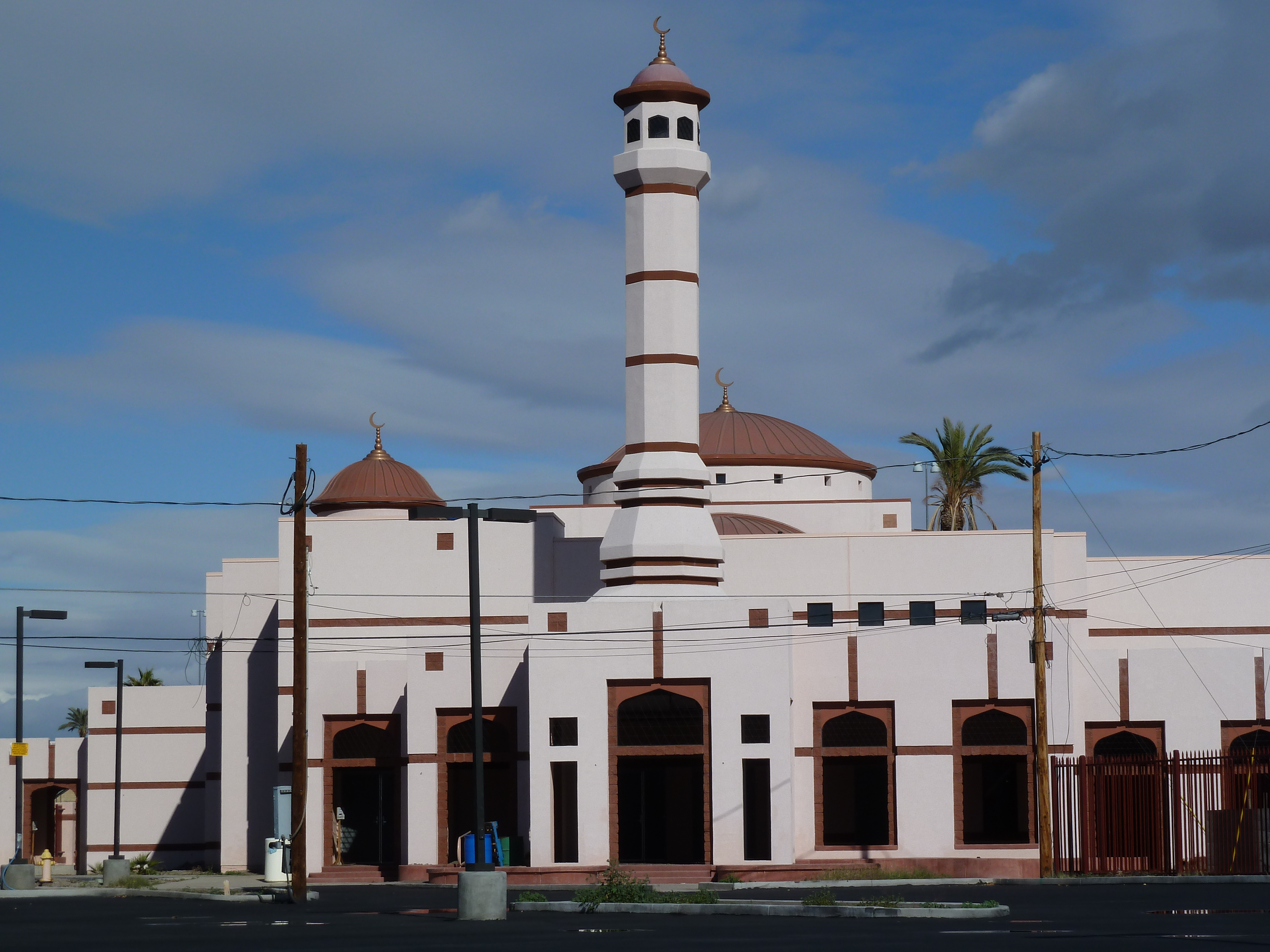

- Location in Arizona

Religion
- Affiliation: Islam
- Ecclesiastical or organizational status: non-profit religious organization

Location
- Location: 7516 North Black Canyon Highway, Phoenix, AZ
- Interactive map of Islamic Community Center of Phoenix
- Coordinates: 33.546571°N 112.112816°W

Architecture
- Type: Mosque
- Established: 1997

Specifications
- Dome: 1
- Minaret: 1

Website
- iccpaz.com

The Islamic Community Center of Phoenix (ICCP), which was founded in 1982, is located at 7516 North Black Canyon Highway, along Interstate 17, in Phoenix, Arizona. It is in a former Baptist church that has been converted into the mosque, having moved into that location in 1997. The land deeds of ICCP are held by the North American Islamic Trust.

== Description ==
The mosque is the spiritual base for many of the Valley of the Sun's 50,000 to 70,000 Muslims. Many of the members of the congregation were originally refugees from Afghanistan, Iraq, and elsewhere. In 2011, the mosque was completing a 17,000-square-foot (1,600 m^{2}) building with a 62-foot (19 m) minaret, one block south of and six times larger than its prior location, which according to its leaders made it the largest Islamic center in the Southwest. During its construction, it was the target of vandalism. The mosque includes an Islamic school. On May 29, 2015, an anti-Muslim protest occurred outside the mosque in response to the attempted Curtis Culwell Center attack.

Usama Shami is the President of the Islamic Community Center of Phoenix. Sheikh Mahmoud Sulaiman, an Al-Azhar University graduate, has served as the imam of the mosque since 2002, prior to which he was imam at the Islamic Center of New Mexico in Albuquerque, New Mexico.

== See also ==
- List of mosques in the Americas
- Lists of mosques
- List of mosques in the United States
